= 2023 New Year Honours (New Zealand) =

Awards list for New Zealand

- Previous: 2022 New Zealand bravery awards Next: 2023 King's Birthday and Coronation Honours
- Type: New Zealand royal honours: New Zealand Order of Merit; Royal Victorian Order; Queen's Service Order; Queen's Service Medal; New Zealand Antarctic Medal; New Zealand Distinguished Service Decoration
- Date: 31 December 2022
- Country: New Zealand
- Total recipients: 184

The 2023 New Year Honours in New Zealand were appointments by Charles III in his right as King of New Zealand, on the advice of the New Zealand government, to various orders and honours to reward and highlight good works by New Zealanders, and to celebrate the passing of 2022 and the beginning of 2023. They were announced on 31 December 2022.

The recipients of honours are listed here as they were styled before their new honour.

== New Zealand Order of Merit ==
=== Dame Companion (DNZM) ===
- Miranda Catherine Millais Harcourt ONZM – of Wellington. For services to the screen industry and theatre.
- Professor Farah Rangikoepa Palmer ONZM – of Palmerston North. For services to sport, particularly rugby.
- Dr Janice Claire Wright – of Christchurch. For services to the state and the environment.
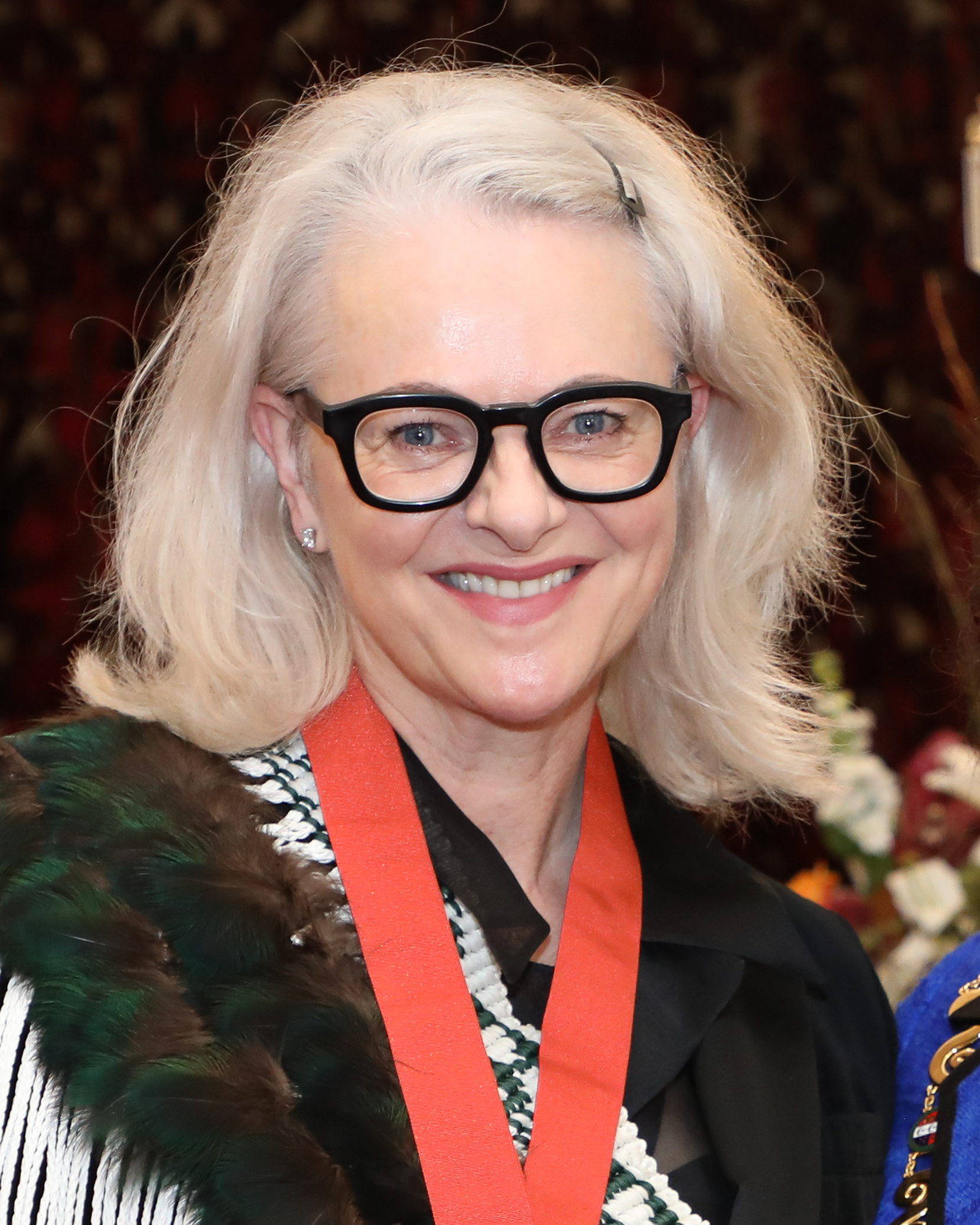
Dame Miranda Harcourt

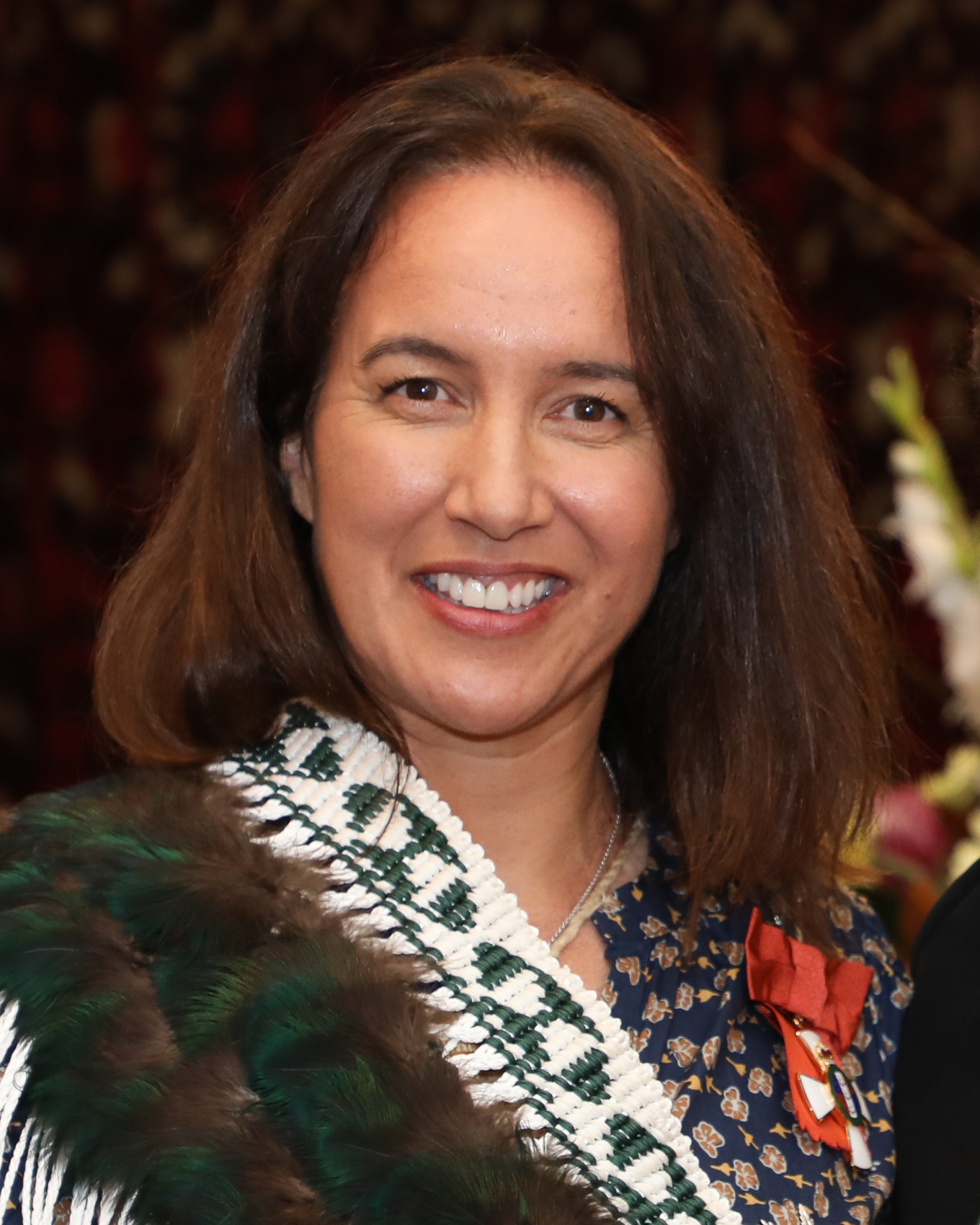
Dame Farah Palmer

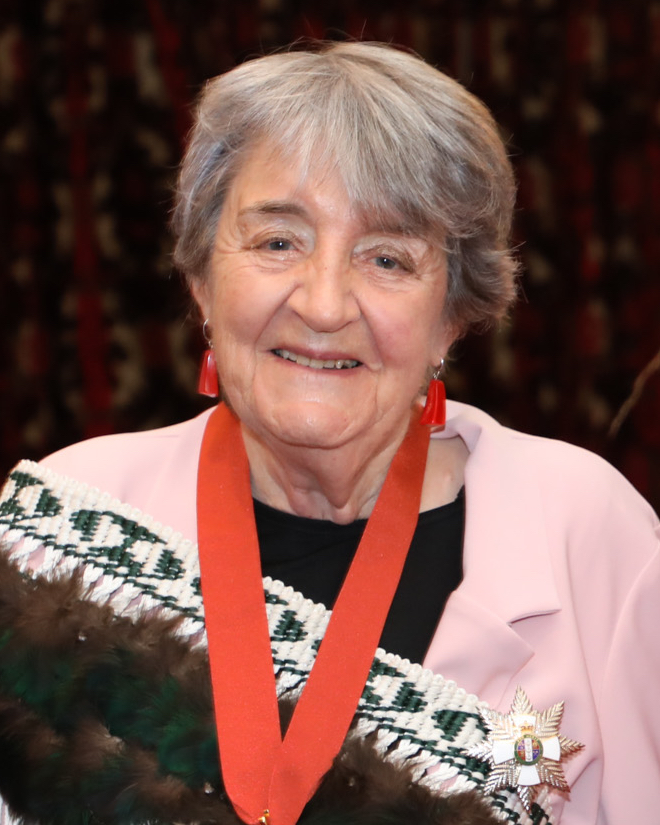
Dame Jan Wright

=== Knight Companion (KNZM) ===
- Dr Ashley Robin Bloomfield – of Lower Hutt. For services to public health.
- Markus Dunajtschik – of Wellington. For services to philanthropy.
- Dr Haare Mahanga Te Wehinga Williams MNZM JP – of Papakura. For services to Māori, literature and education.
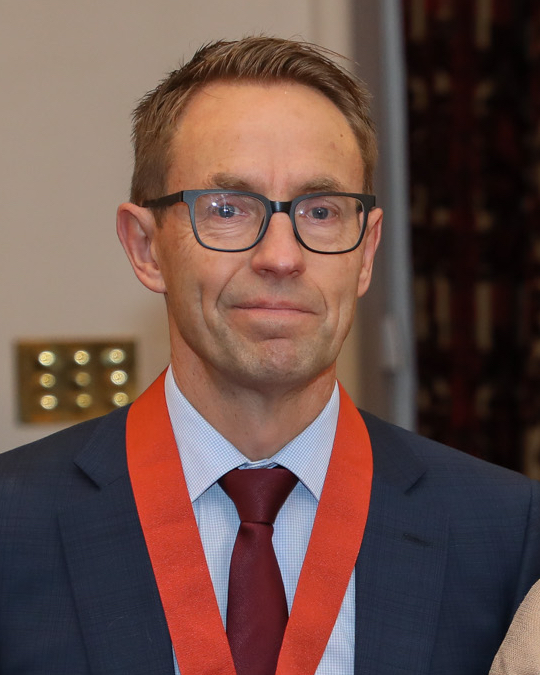
Sir Ashley Bloomfield

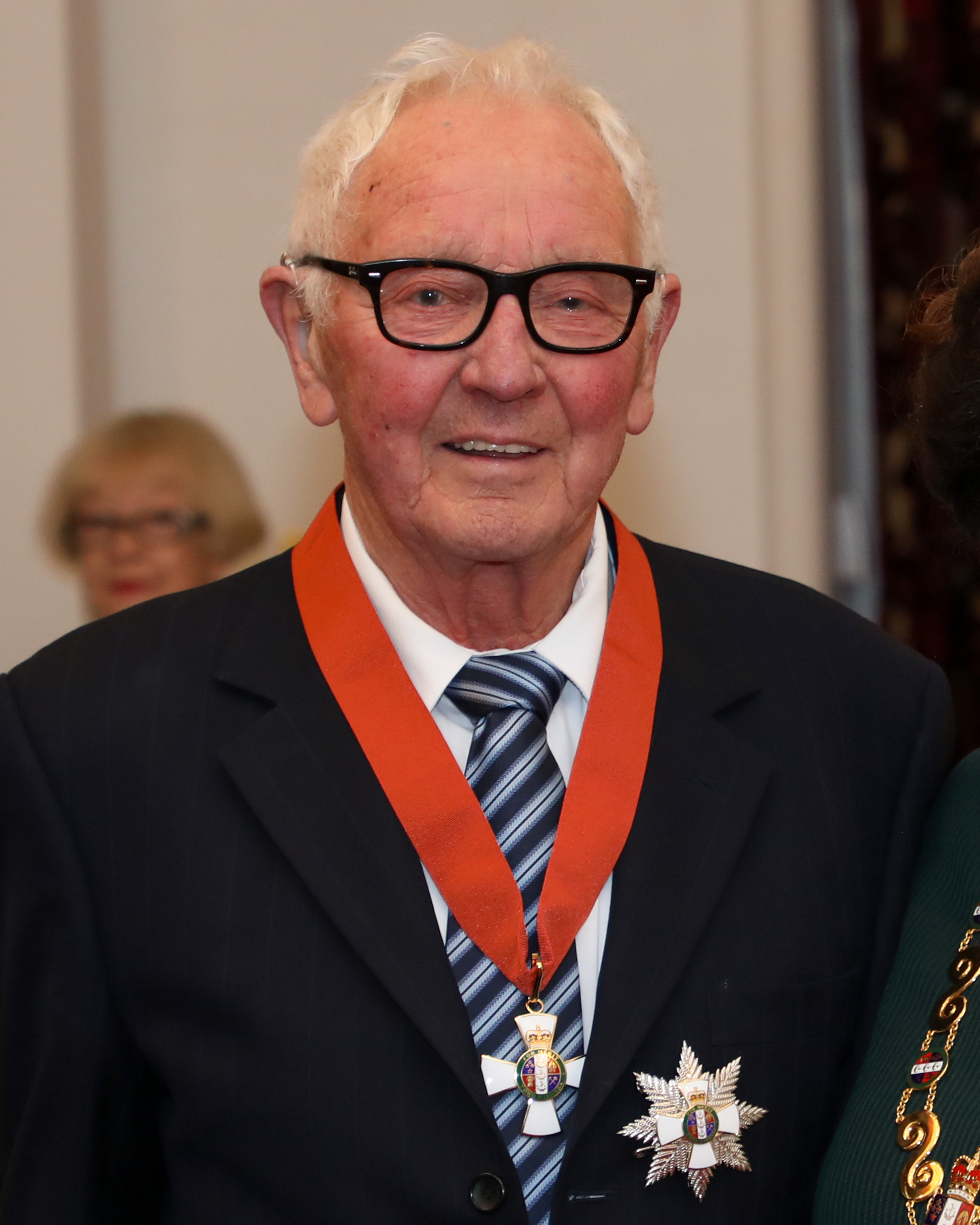
Sir Mark Dunajtschik

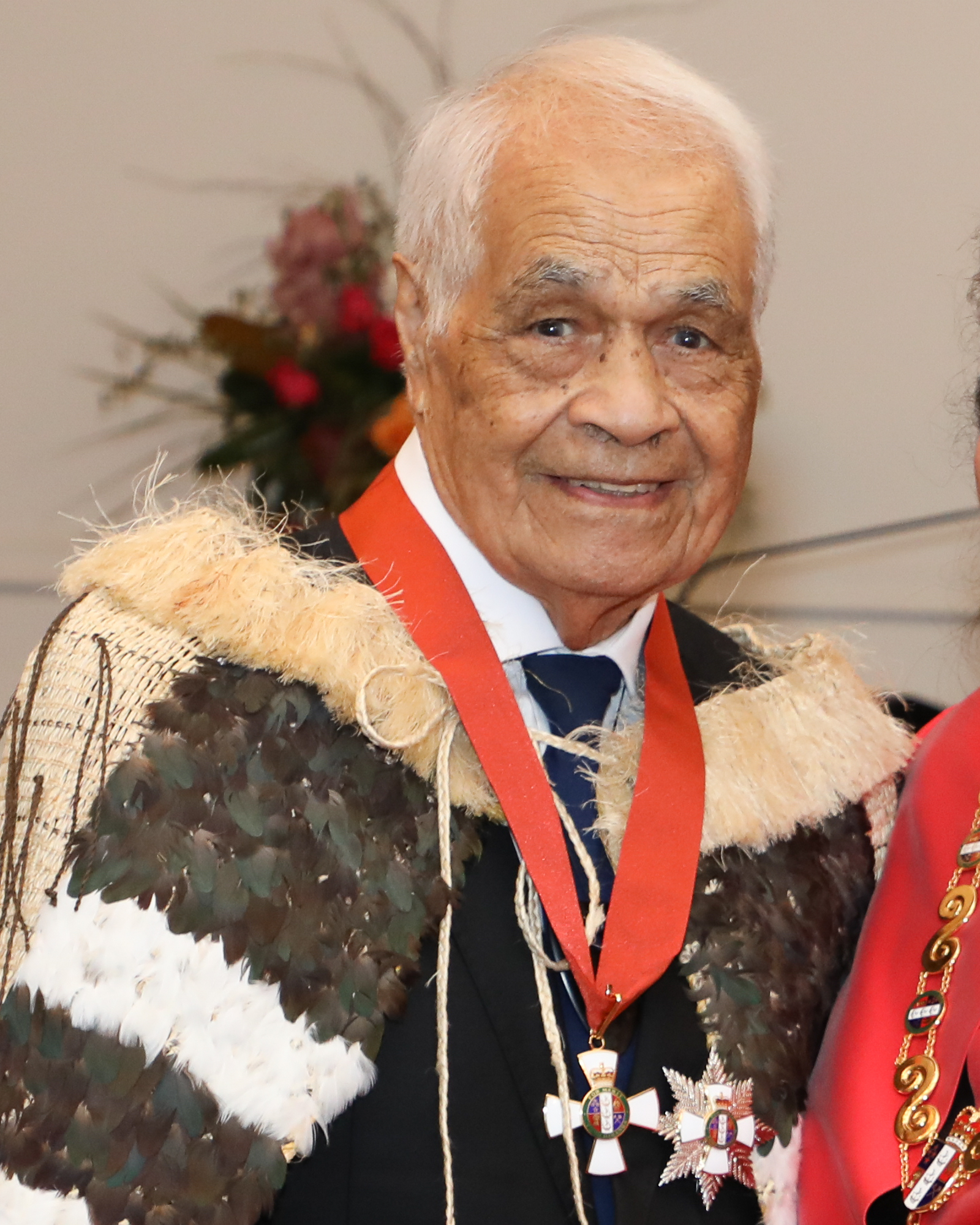
Sir Haare Williams

=== Companion (CNZM) ===
- Michael Francis Barnett ONZM – of Papakura. For services to business.
- Hamish Bryon Bond MNZM – of Durham, North Carolina. For services to rowing.
- Dr Bruce Donald Campbell – of Kerikeri. For services to plant and food research.
- Professor Helen Victoria Danesh-Meyer – of Auckland. For services to ophthalmology.
- Leigh Helen Gibbs ONZM – of Nelson. For services to netball.
- Trevor Horowaewae Maxwell MNZM – of Rotorua. For services to Māori and local government.
- Paul Te Poa Karoro Reginald Morgan QSO – of Nelson. For services to Māori and business.
- Eric Gordon Murray MNZM – of Cambridge. For services to rowing.
- Emeritus Professor David Gerard Simmons – of Christchurch. For services to tourism and tertiary education.
- Kereyn Maree Smith MNZM – of Auckland. For services to sports governance.
- Lisa Tumahai – of Hokitika. For services to Māori development.
- The Honourable Mititaiagimene Young Vivian – of Hakupu, Niue. For services to Niue.
- Kaa Kataraina Kathleen Williams QSO – of Auckland. For services to Māori and education.
- Tawhirimatea Te Auripo Rewita Williams MNZM – of Auckland. For services to Māori and education.
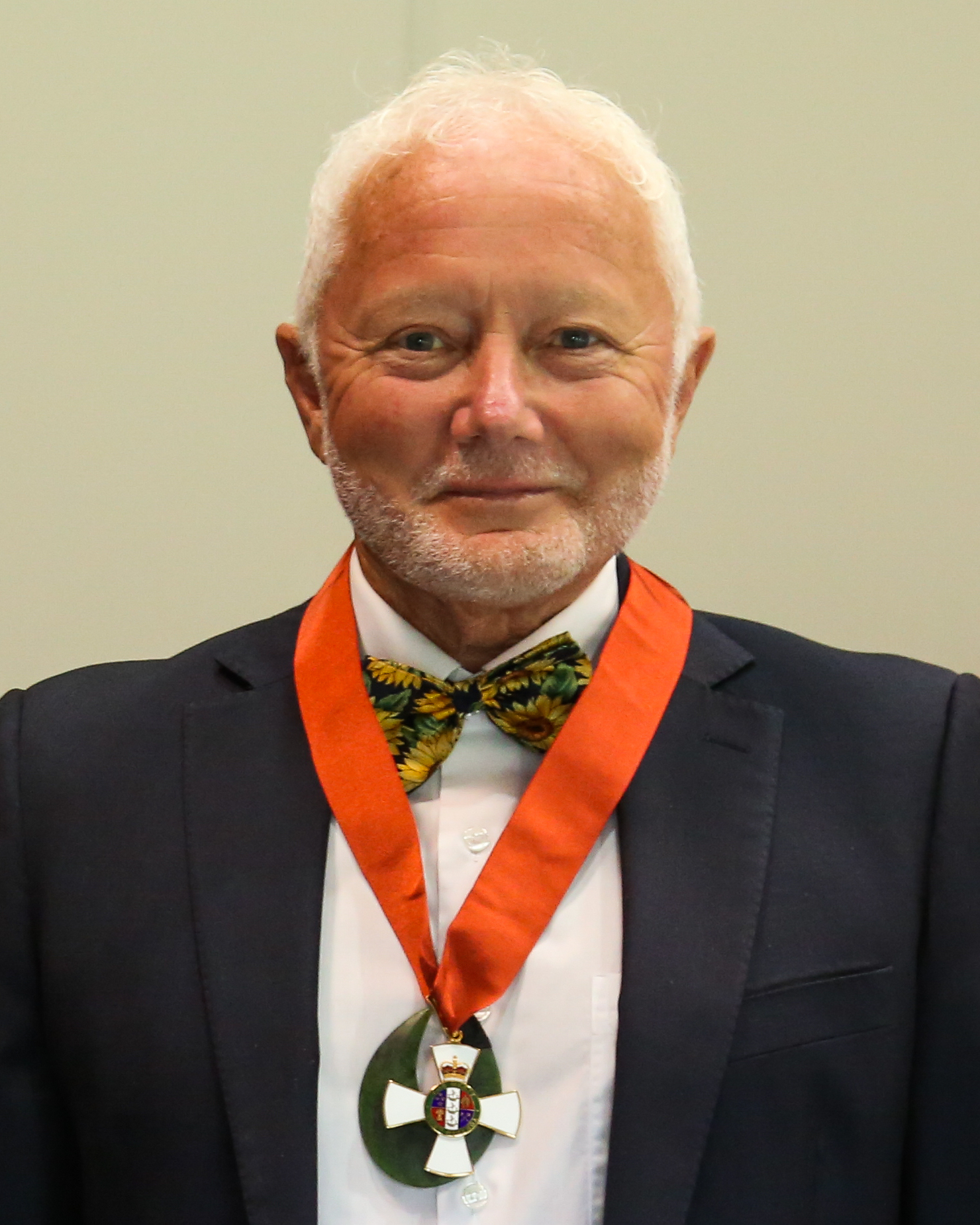
Michael Barnett

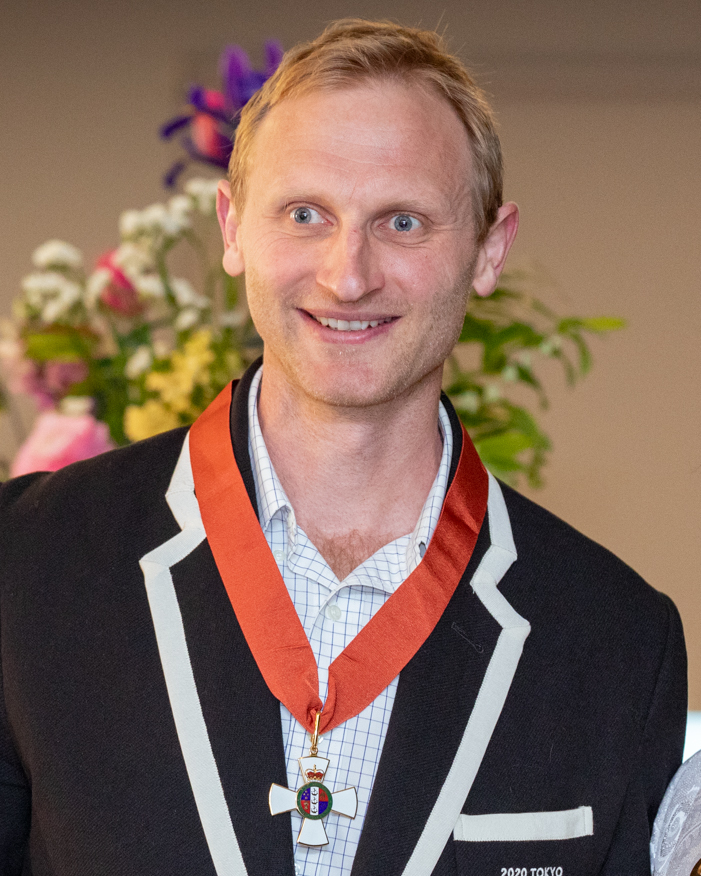
Hamish Bond

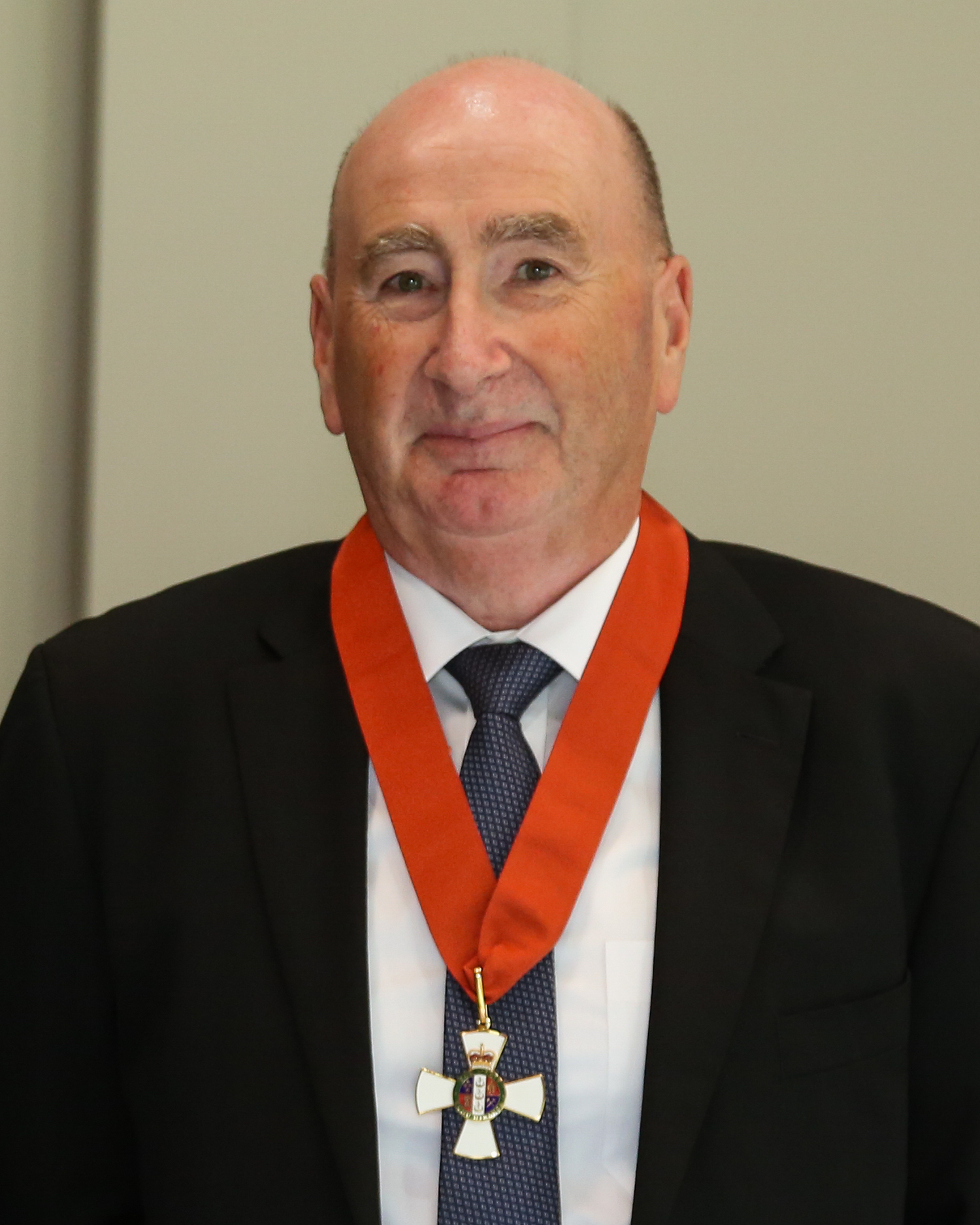
Bruce Campbell

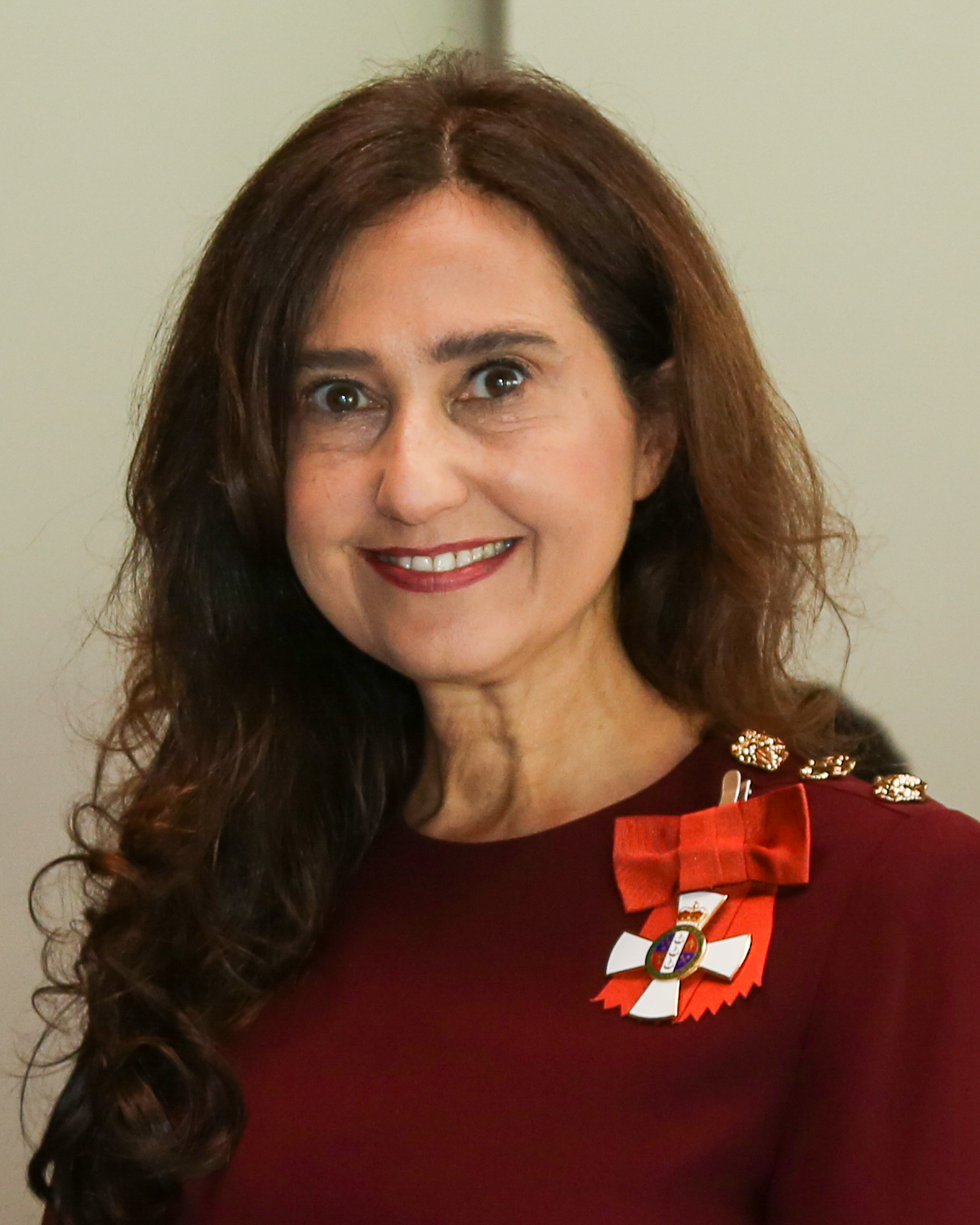
Helen Danesh‑Meyer

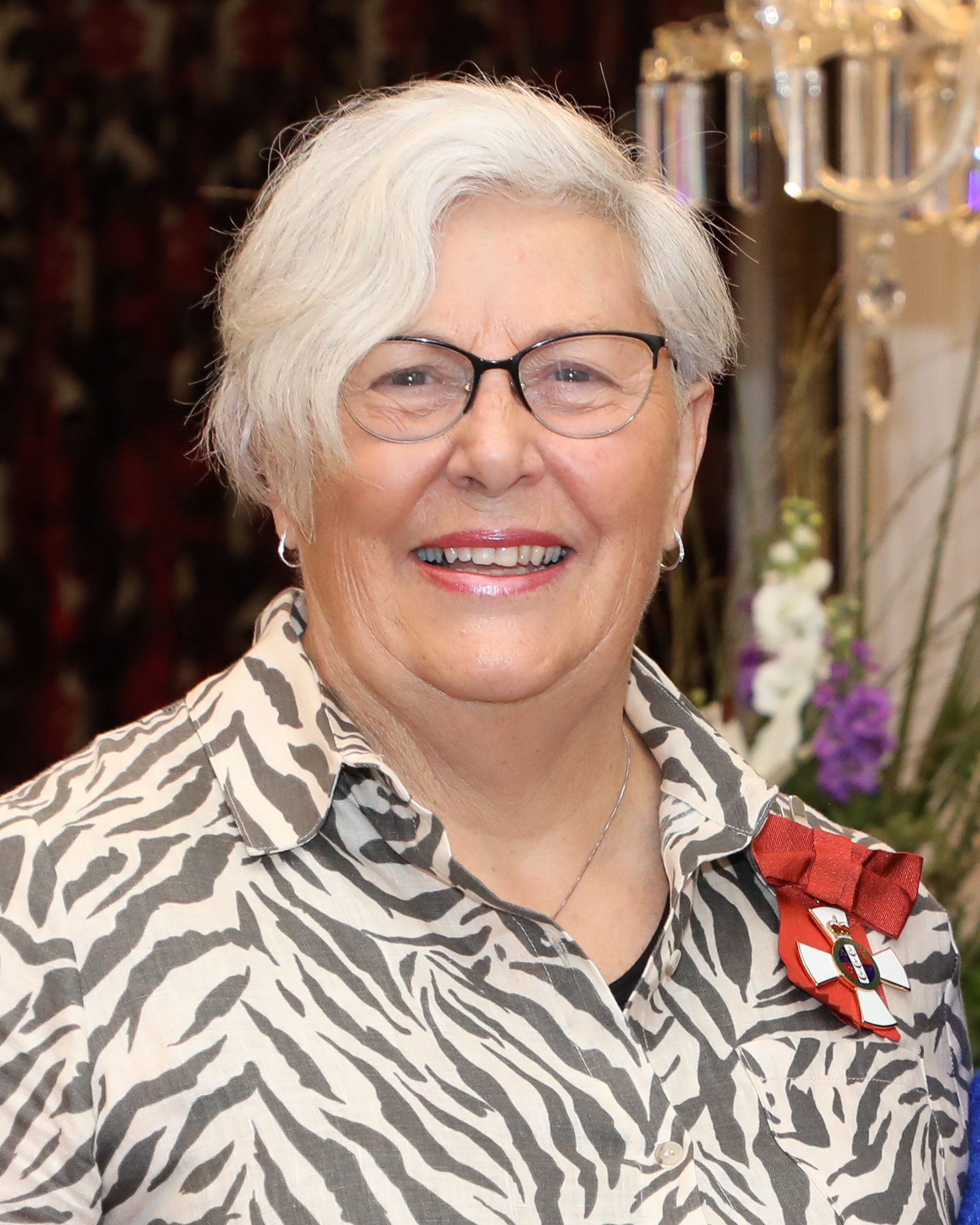
Leigh Gibbs

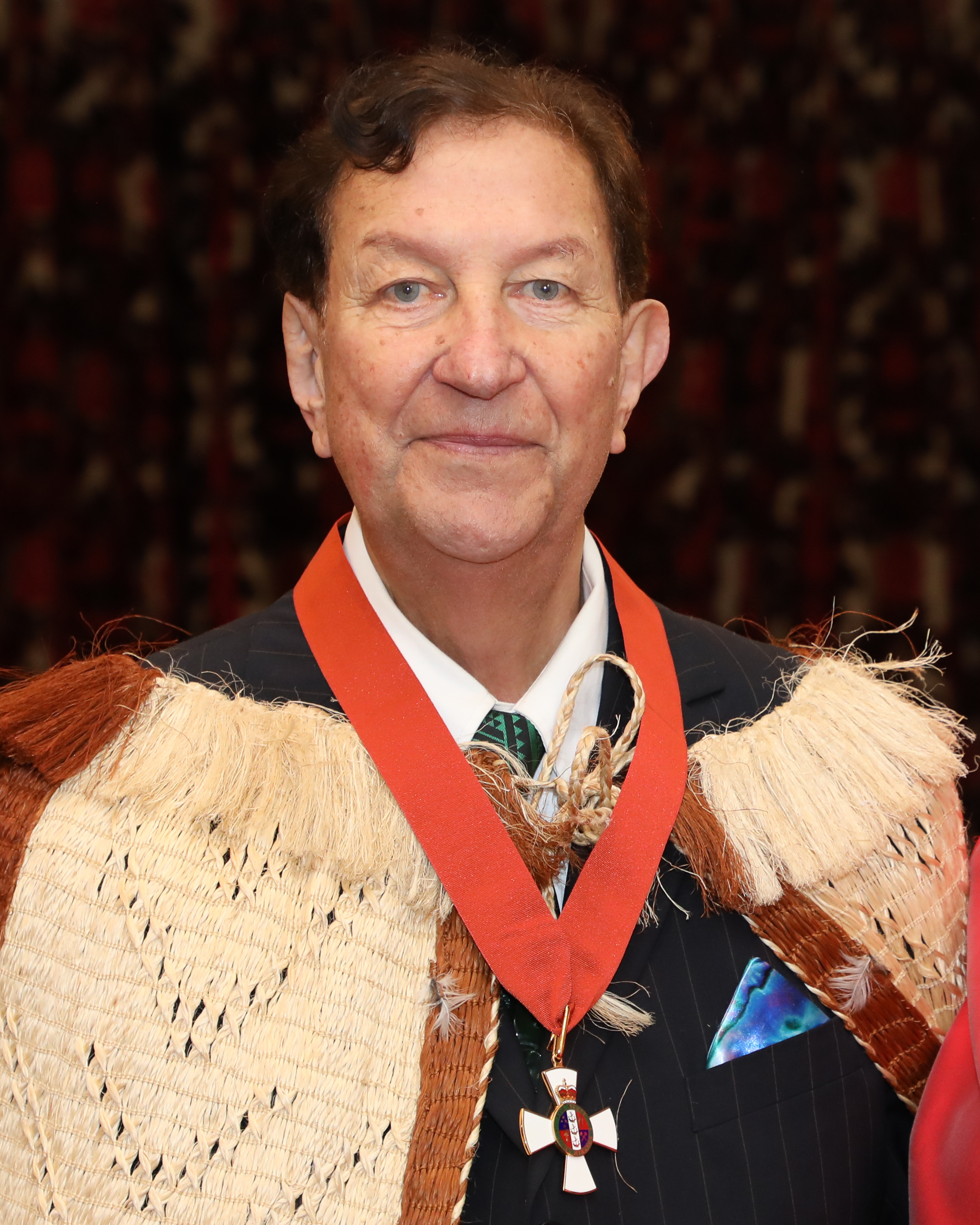
Trevor Maxwell

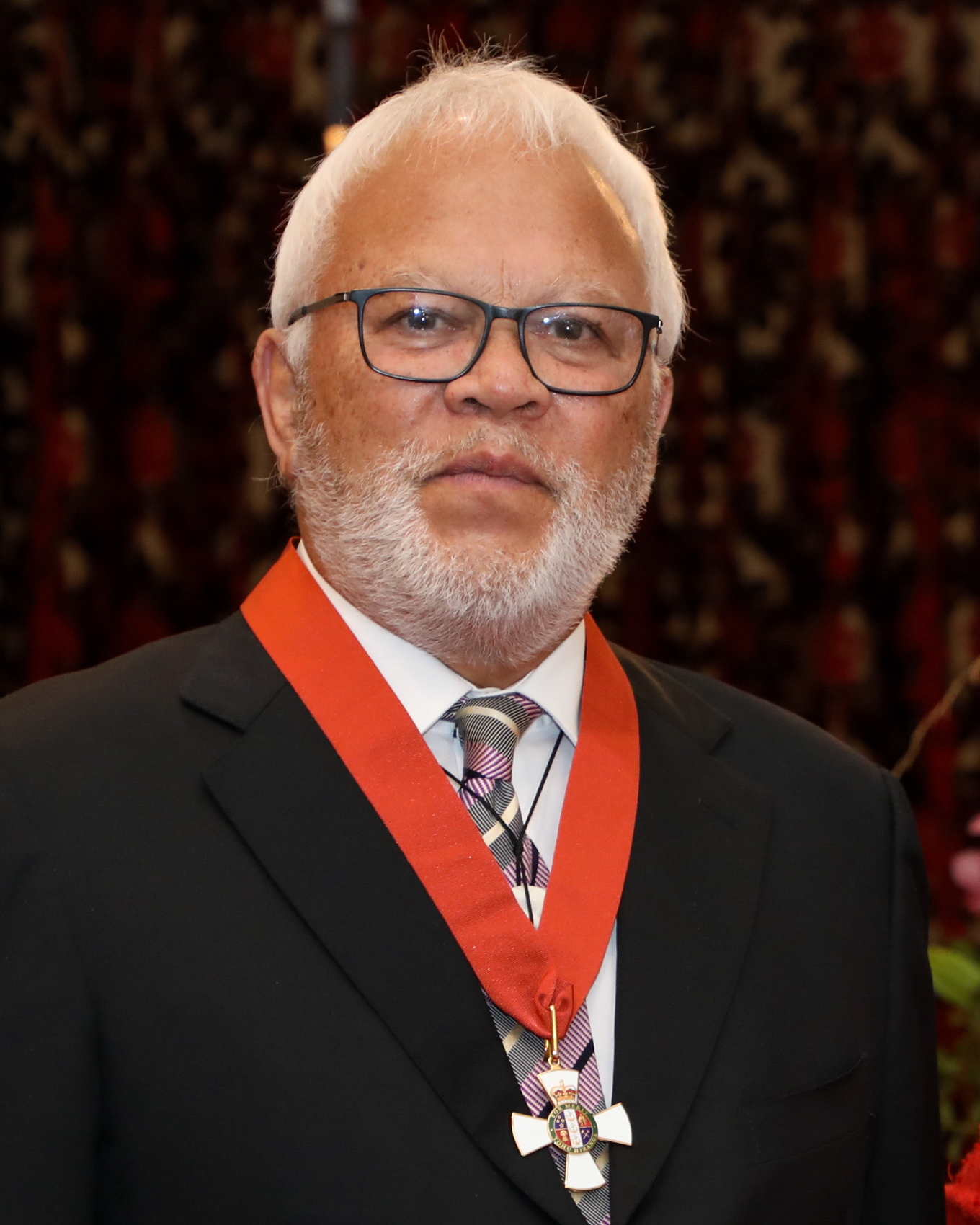
Paul Morgan

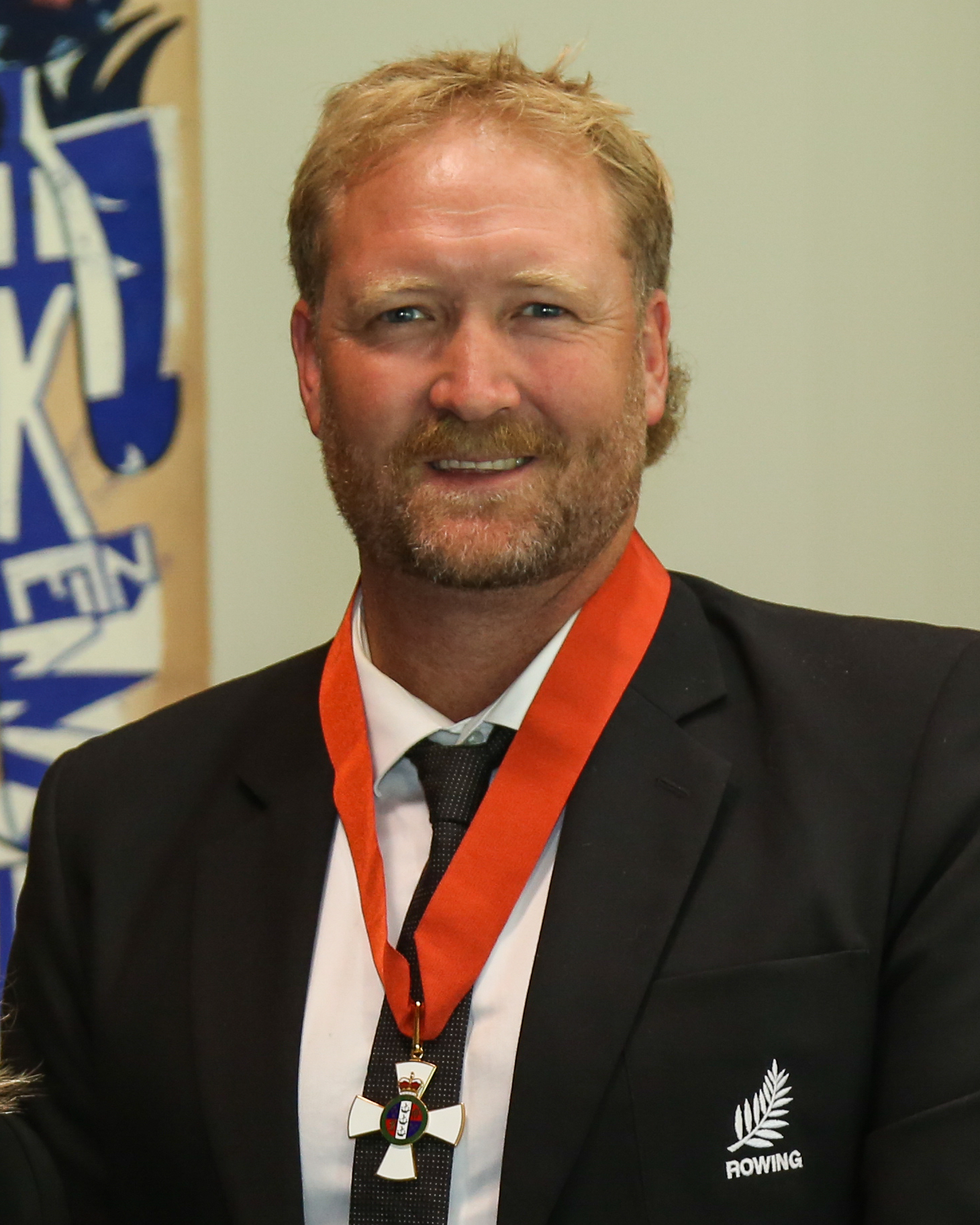
Eric Murray

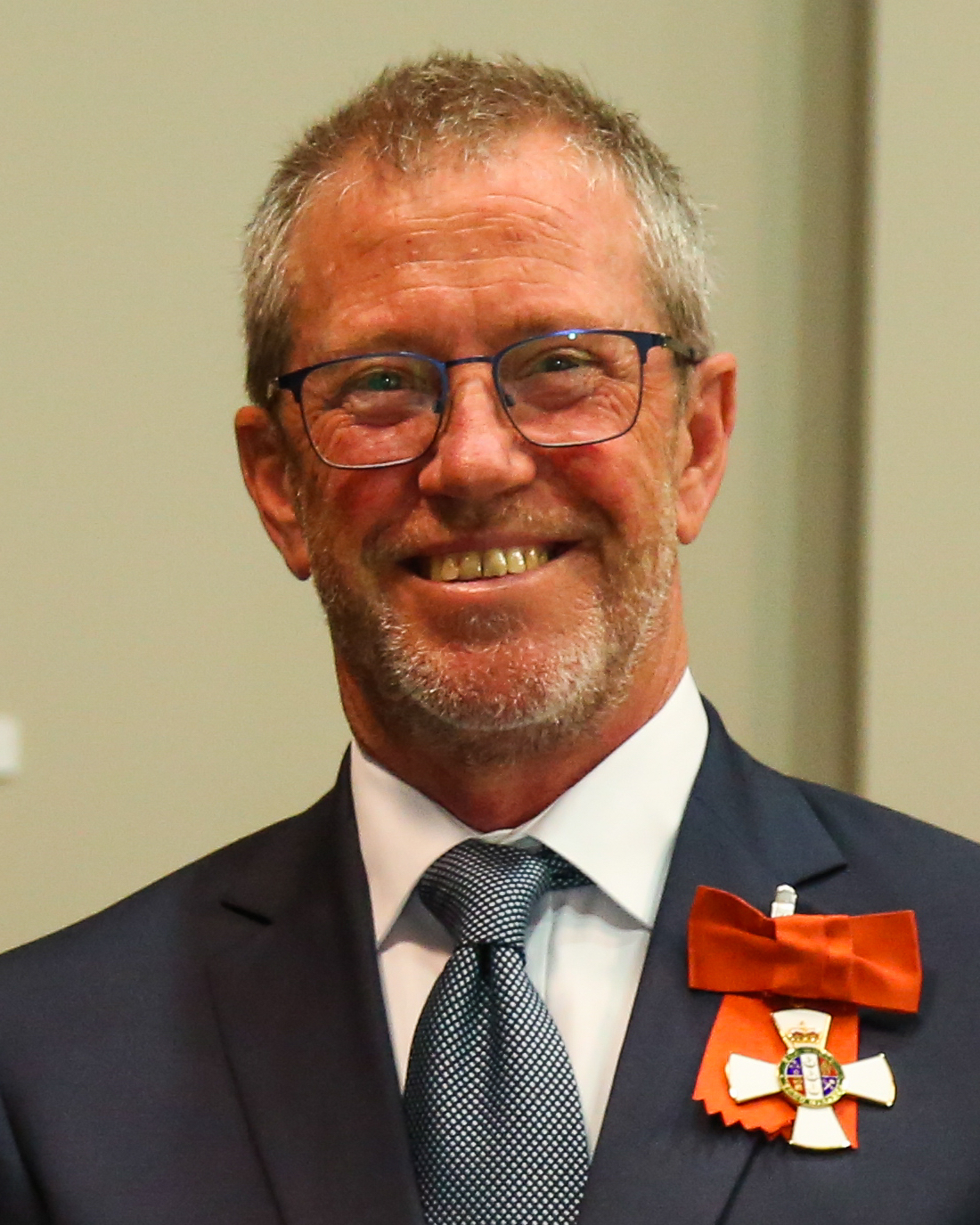
David Simmons

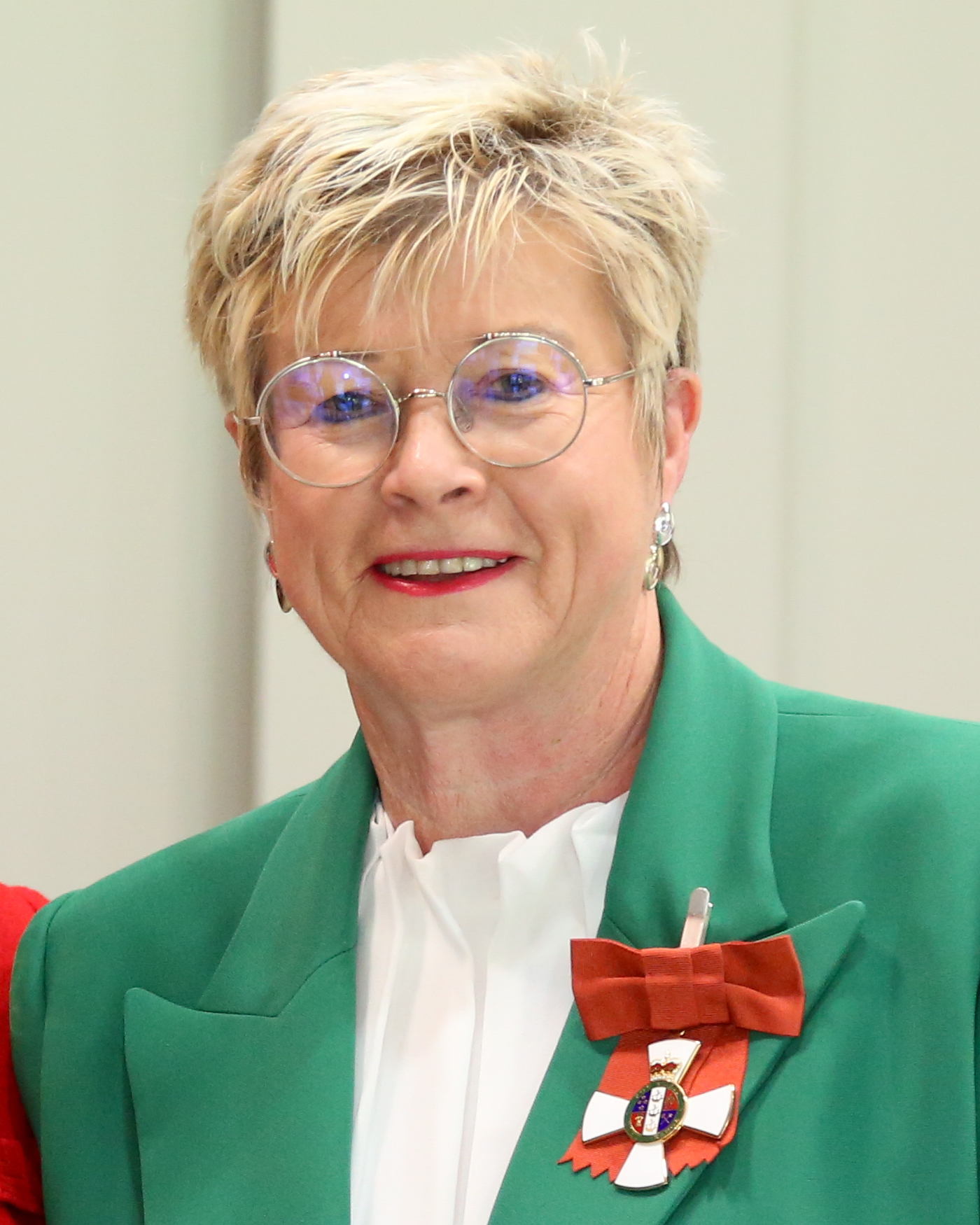
Kereyn Smith

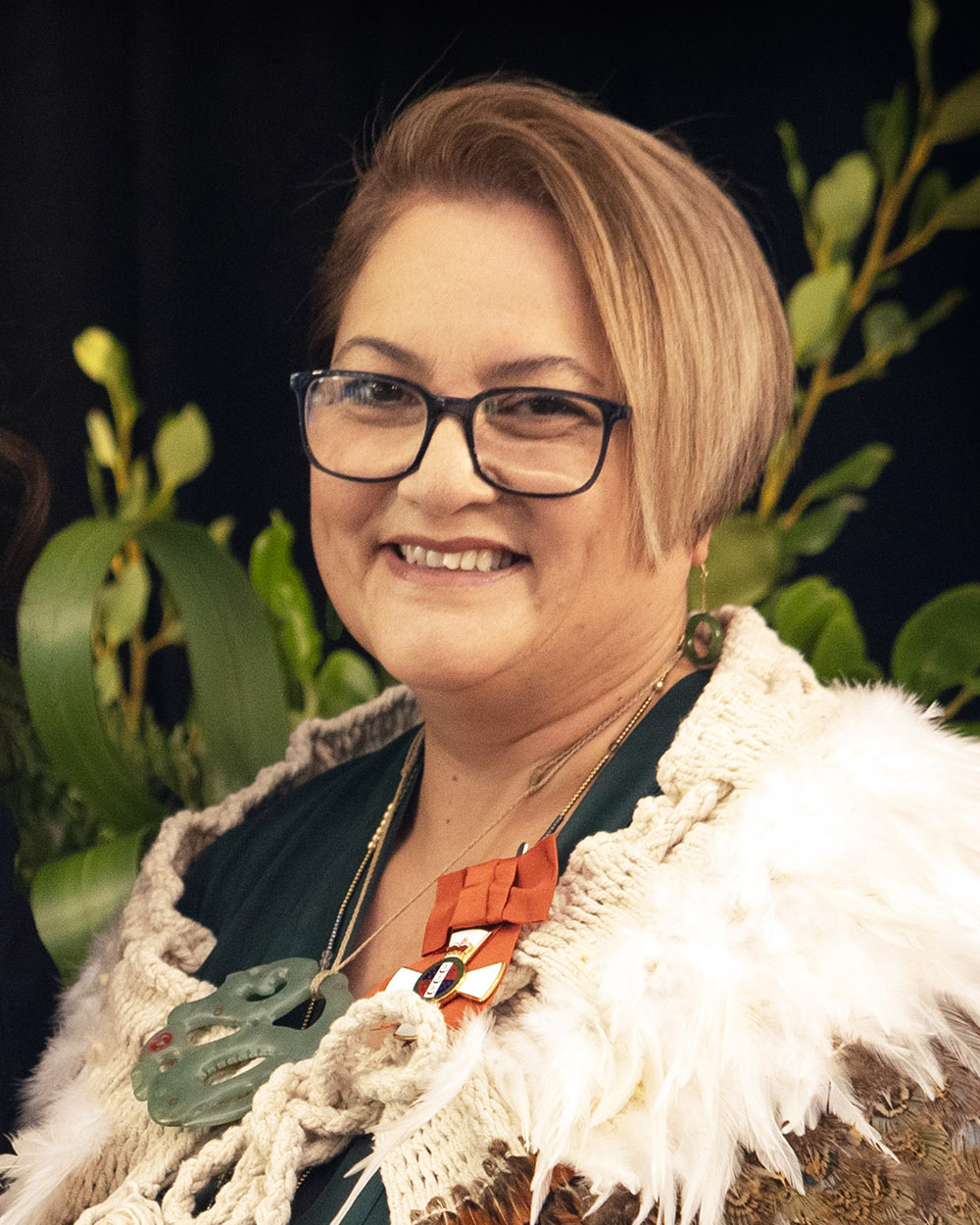
Lisa Tumahai

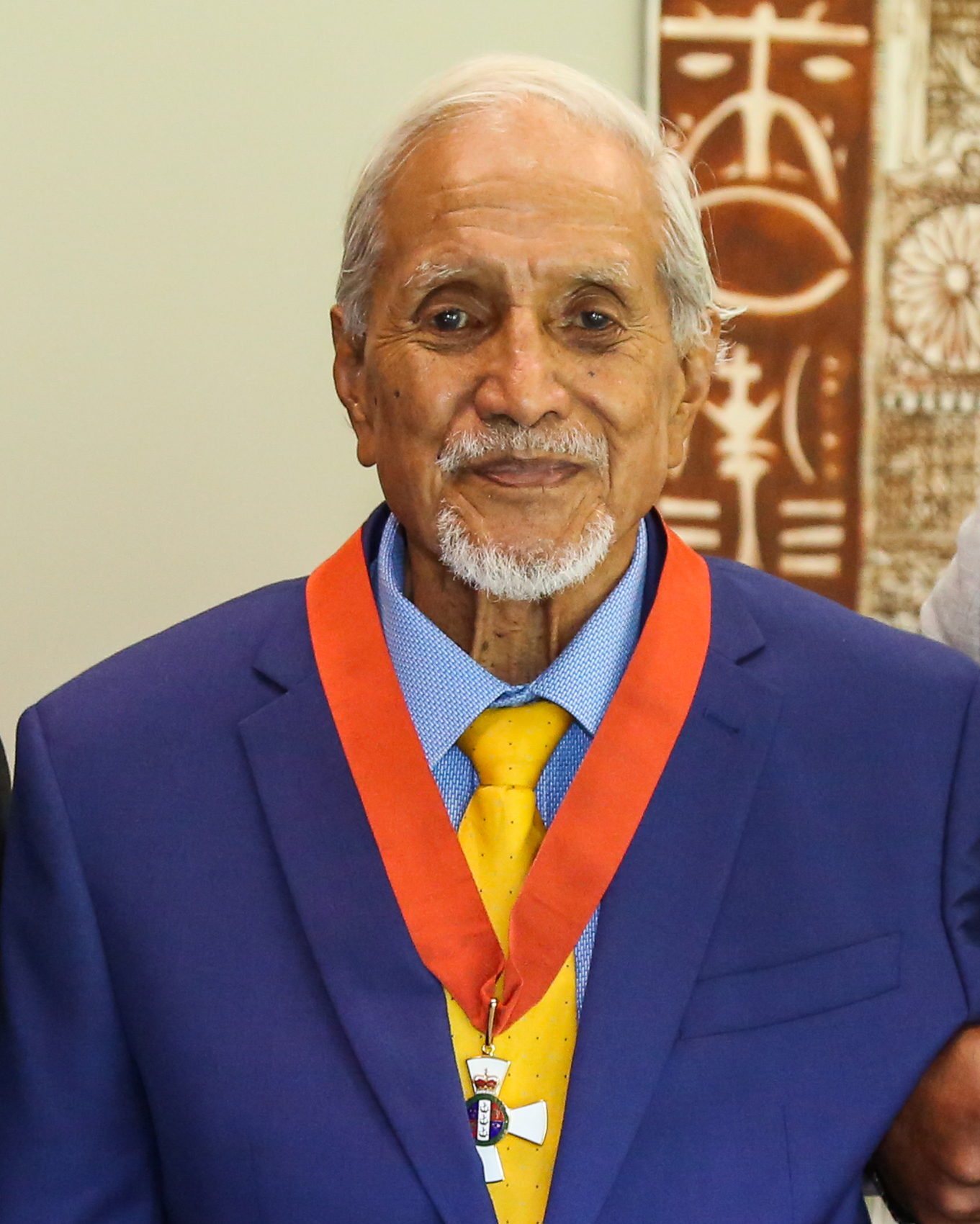
Young Vivian

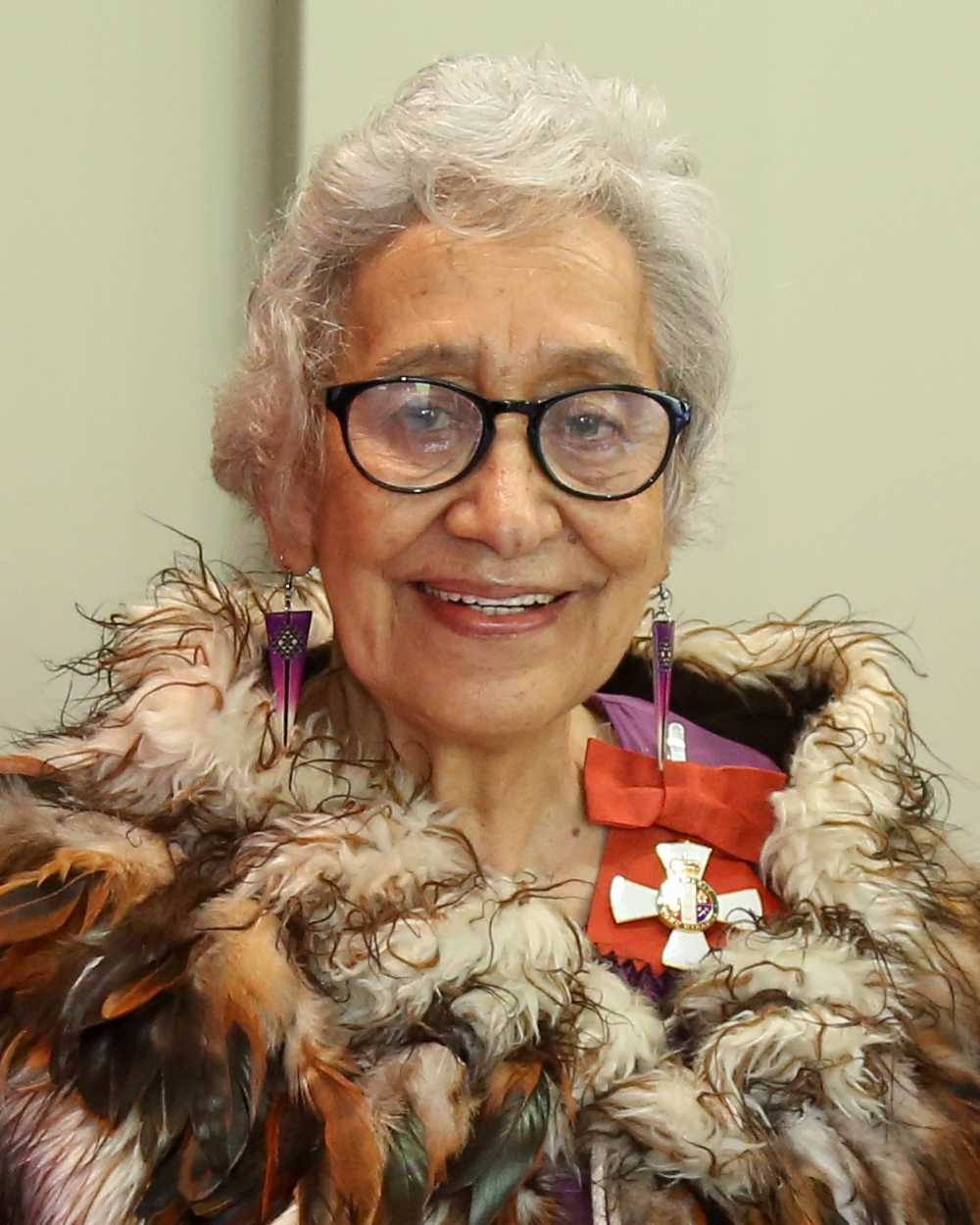
Kaa Williams

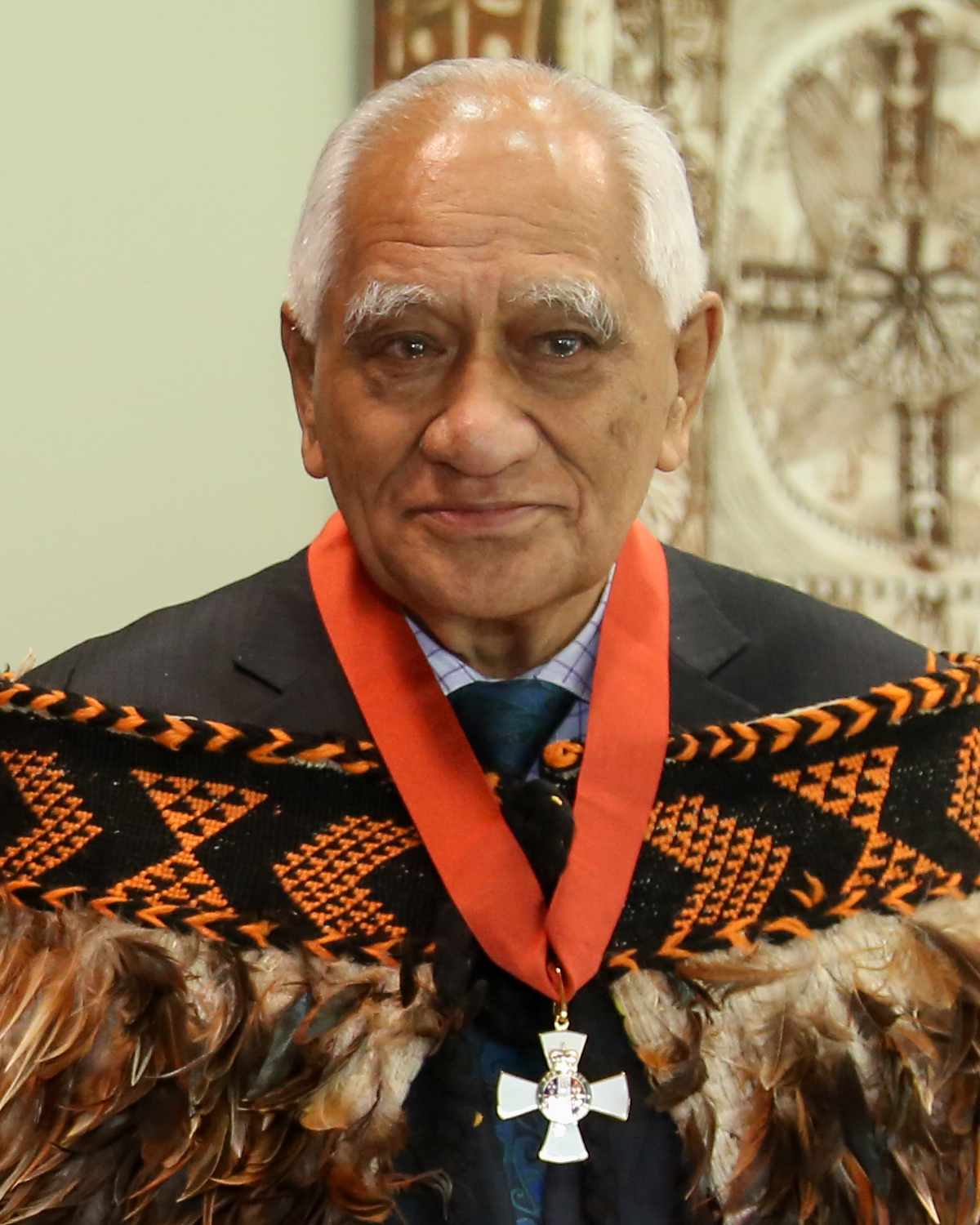
Tawhiri Williams

=== Officer (ONZM) ===
- Michèle Edith A'Court – of Auckland. For services to the entertainment and comedy industries.
- Martin Ranfurly Bennett – of Putāruru. For services to the environment and the community.
- Elizabeth Anne Caldwell – of Wellington. For services to the arts.
- Barry John Clark QSM JP – of Kaiapoi. For services to the Royal New Zealand Returned and Services' Association.
- Dr Bruce Dudley Clarkson – of Hamilton. For services to ecological restoration.
- Grant Cleland – of Christchurch. For services to disabled people.
- Paul Daniel Coll – of Rijnsburg, Netherlands. For services to squash.
- Professor Emerita Jennie Lynne Connor – of Auckland. For services to alcohol harm reduction.
- John Terence Darby – of Wānaka. For services to wildlife conservation and science.
- Brian Patrick Donnelly – of Auckland. For services to social housing.
- Deputy Commissioner Glenn Murray Dunbier – of Wellington. For services to the New Zealand Police and the community.
- Nathan Edward Fa’avae – of Upper Moutere. For services to adventure racing, outdoor education and the Pacific community.
- David Rodney Fane – of Auckland. For services to the performing arts.
- Grahame Boston Fong – of Auckland. For services to powerlifting.
- Dr Natalie Joan Gauld – of Auckland. For services to pharmacy and health.
- Joanne Lisa Gibbs – of Puhoi. For services to public health.
- Cindy Leigh Johns – of New Plymouth. For services to people with learning disabilities.
- Ian Keith MacEwan – of Napier. For services to addiction services.
- Beryl Te Haumihiata Mason – of Tāneatua. For services to Māori language education.
- Waihaere Joseph Mason MNZM – of Nelson. For services to Māori and education.
- Professor Rangiānehu Mātāmua – of Hamilton. For services to Māori astronomy.
- Anita Jane Mazzoleni – of Cambridge. For services to corporate governance.
- Bernard Joseph McKone – of Cromwell. For services to the pharmaceutical sector.
- Janine Rania Morrell-Gunn – of Christchurch. For services to children’s television and the community.
- Don Edward Mortensen – of Christchurch. For services to the prevention of sexual harm.
- Pānia Christine Papa – of Kawau Island. For services to Māori language education and broadcasting.
- Khoa Dang (Mitchell) Pham – of Auckland. For services to the technology sector and New Zealand–Asia relations.
- Professor Edwina Pio – of Auckland. For services to ethnic communities.
- Christine Anne Rogan – of Wellsford. For services to alcohol harm reduction.
- Nicola Maree Smith-Guerin – of Auckland. For services to anaesthesiology.
- Dr Apisalome Sikaidoka Talemaitoga – of Auckland. For services to health and the Pacific community.
- Lisa-Jane Taouma – of Auckland. For services to Pacific arts and the screen industry.
- Charles Richard Veitch – of Papakura. For services to wildlife conservation.
- Dr Kathleen Joy Walker – of Nelson. For services to wildlife conservation.
- Peter Muru Edward Walters – of Auckland. For services to touch rugby.
- Paula Mapuna Werohia-Lloyd – of Tauranga. For services to Māori and business.
- Kenneth Michael Williams – of Auckland. For services to governance and the community.
- Te Puea Pekerangi Eileen Winiata – of Auckland. For services to Māori and health
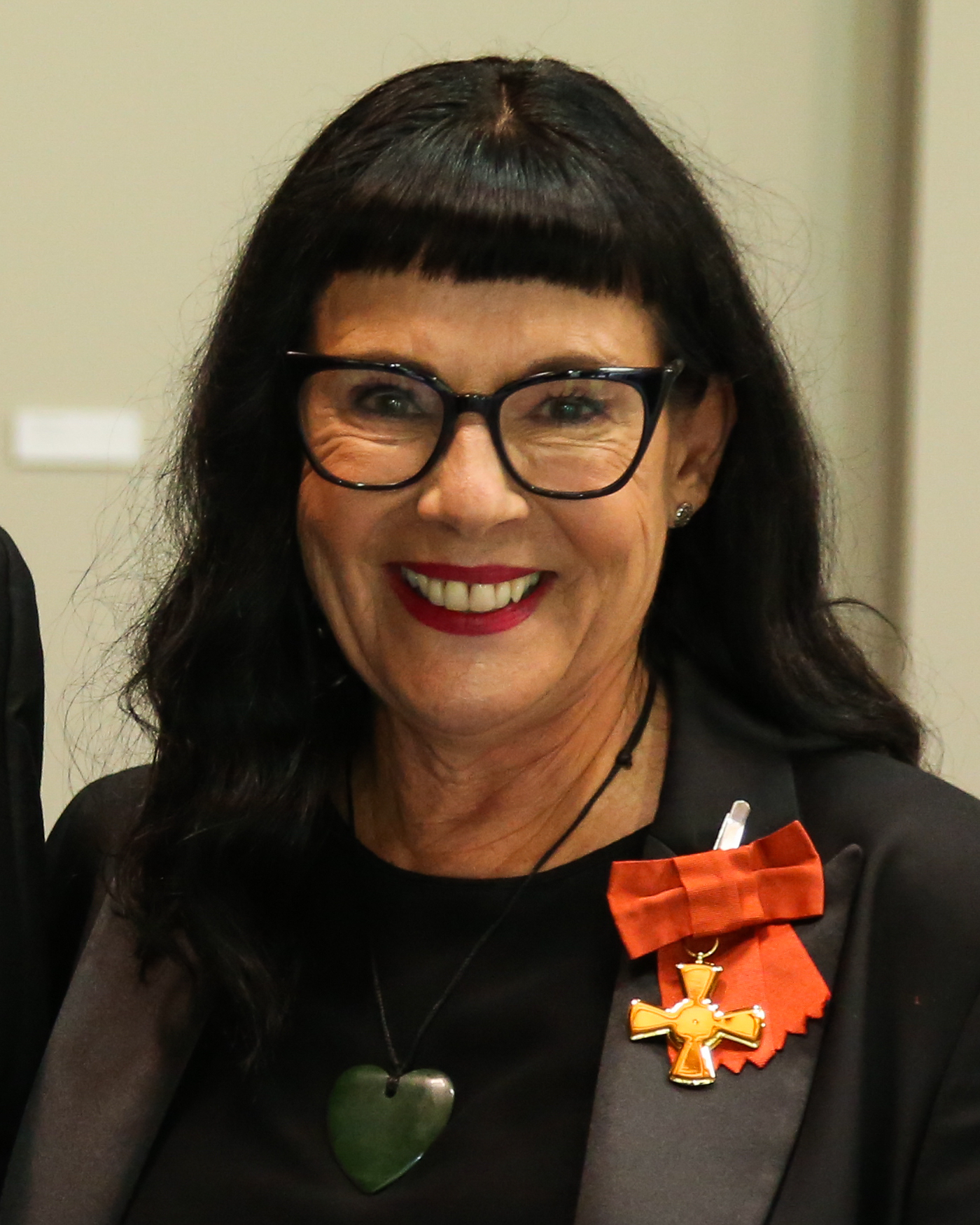
Michèle A'Court

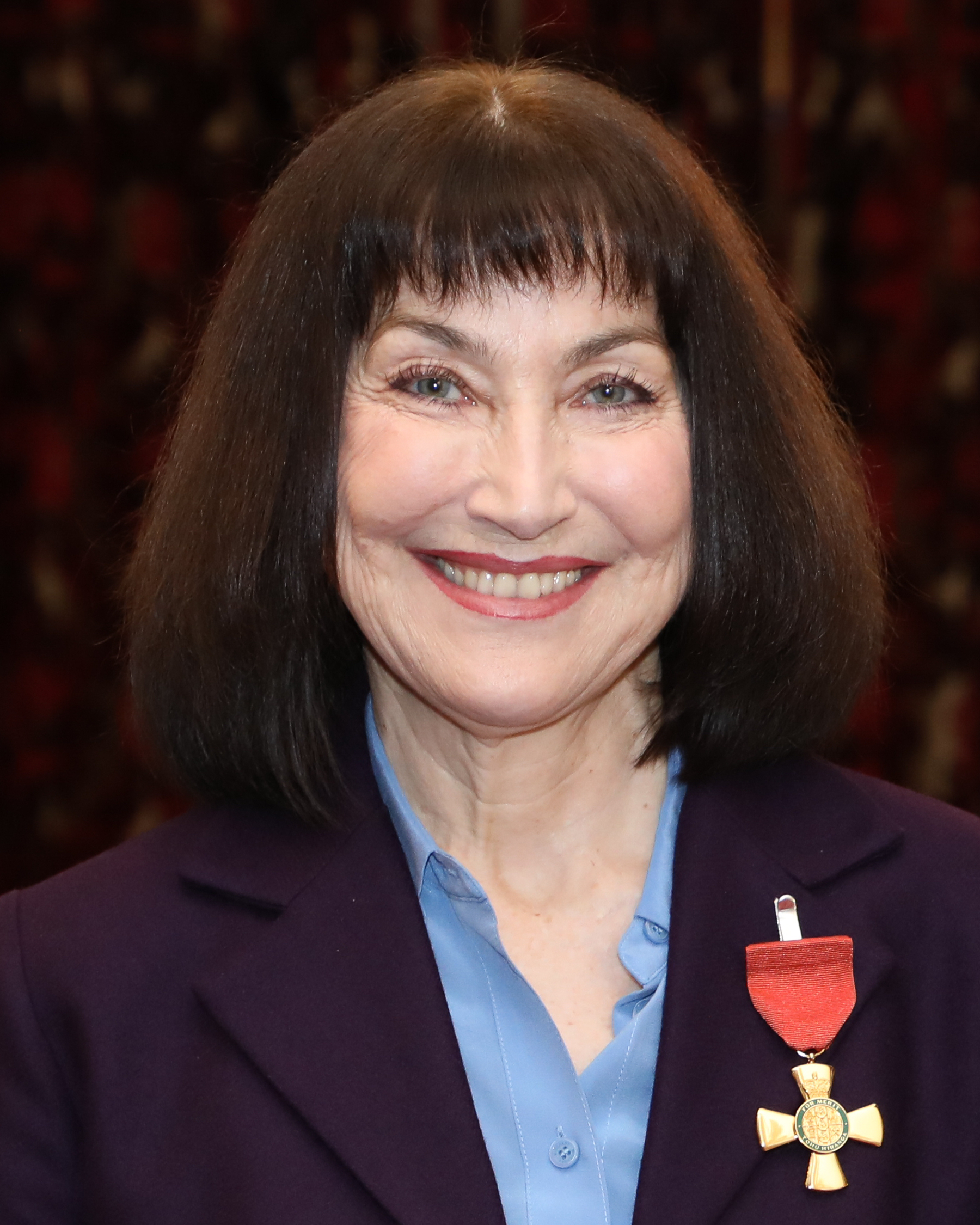
Elizabeth Caldwell

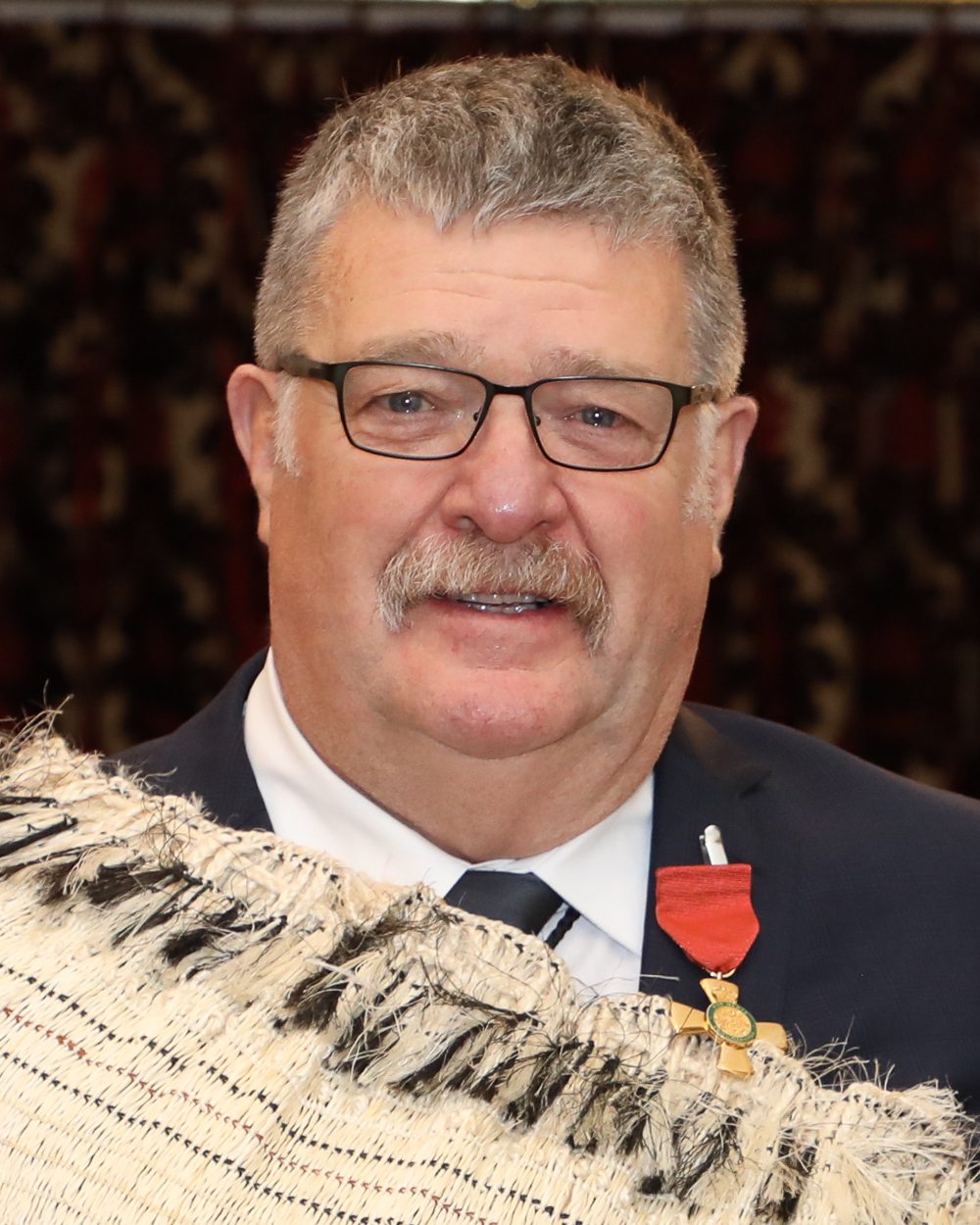
BJ Clark

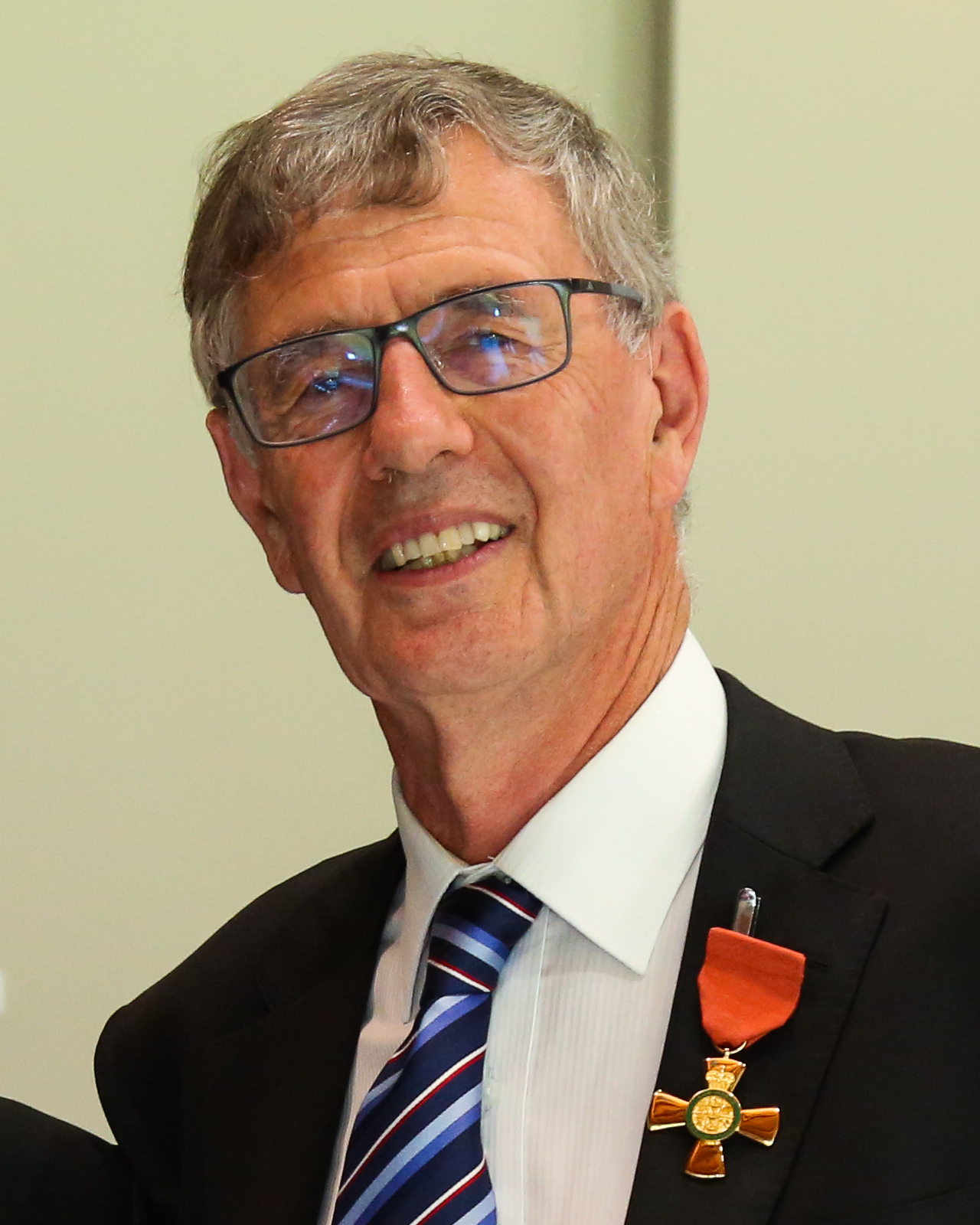
Bruce Clarkson

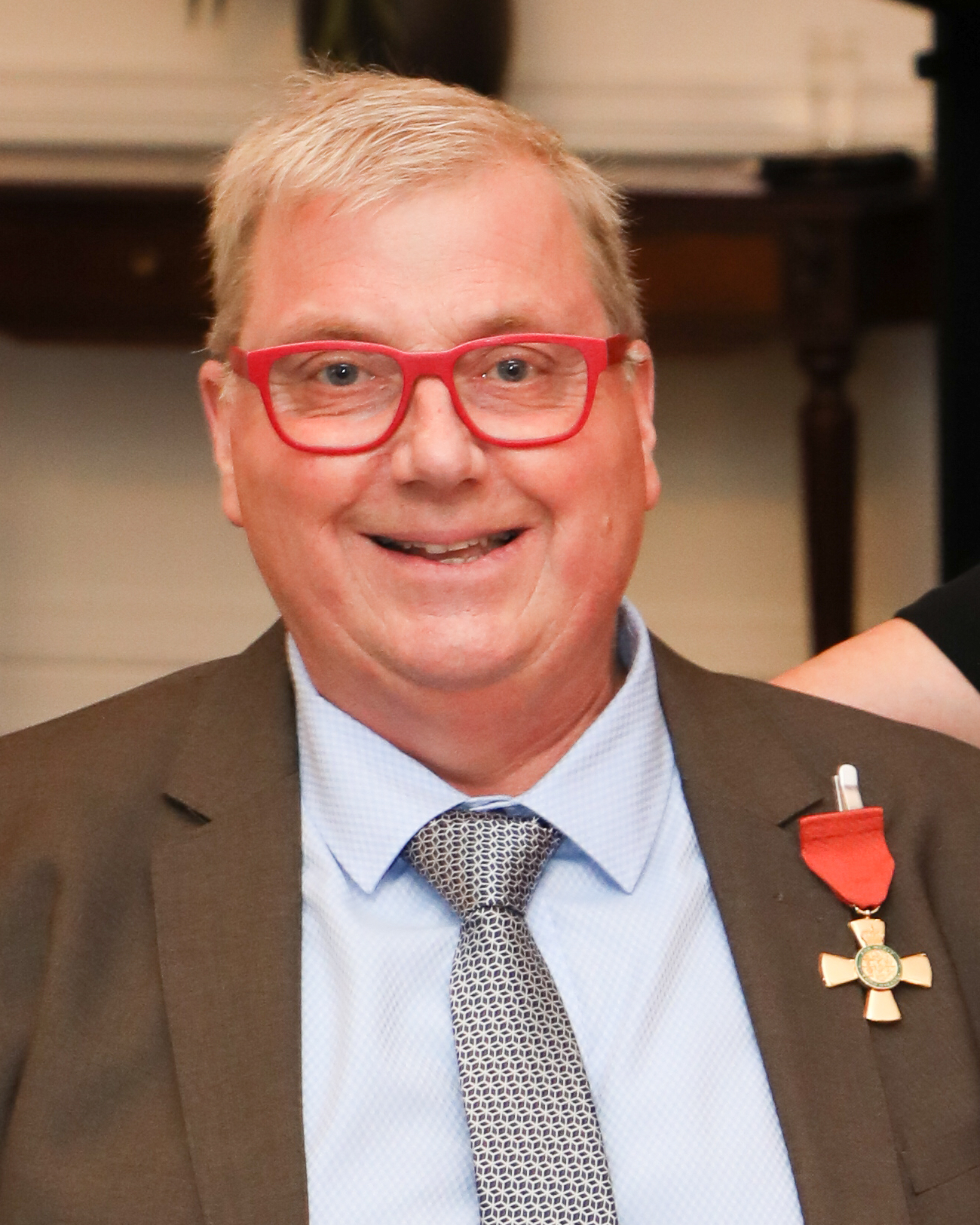
Grant Cleland

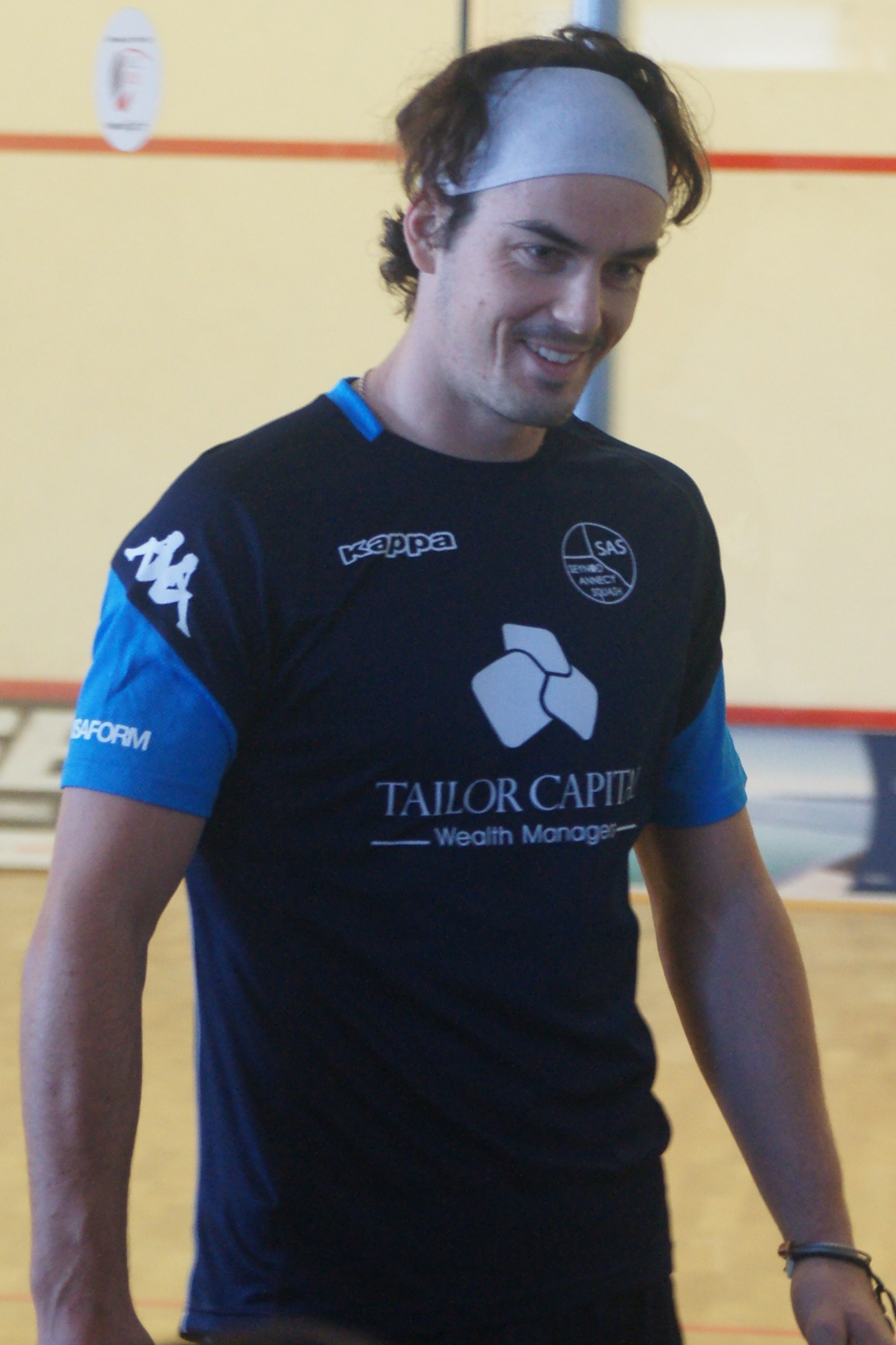
Paul Coll

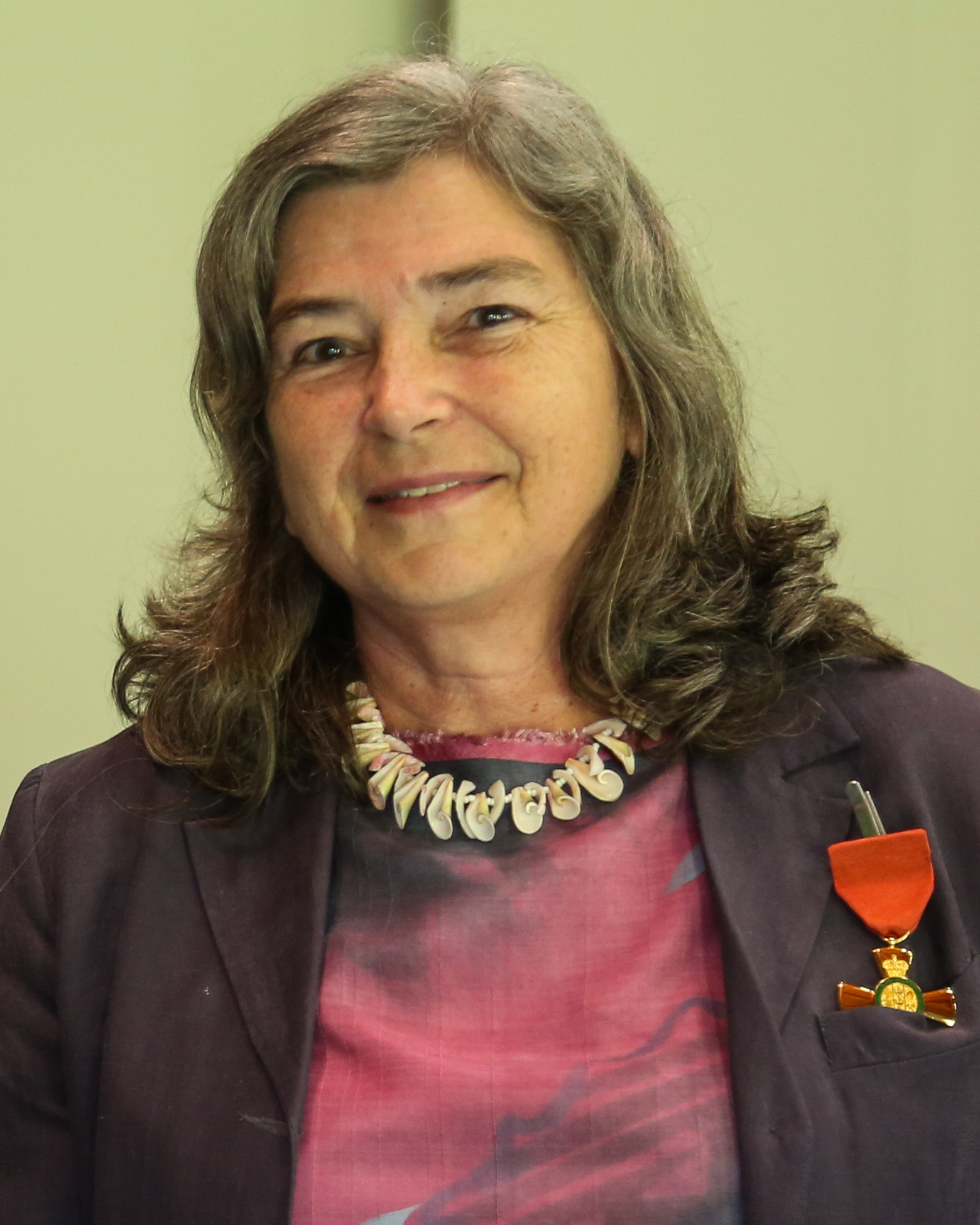
Jennie Connor

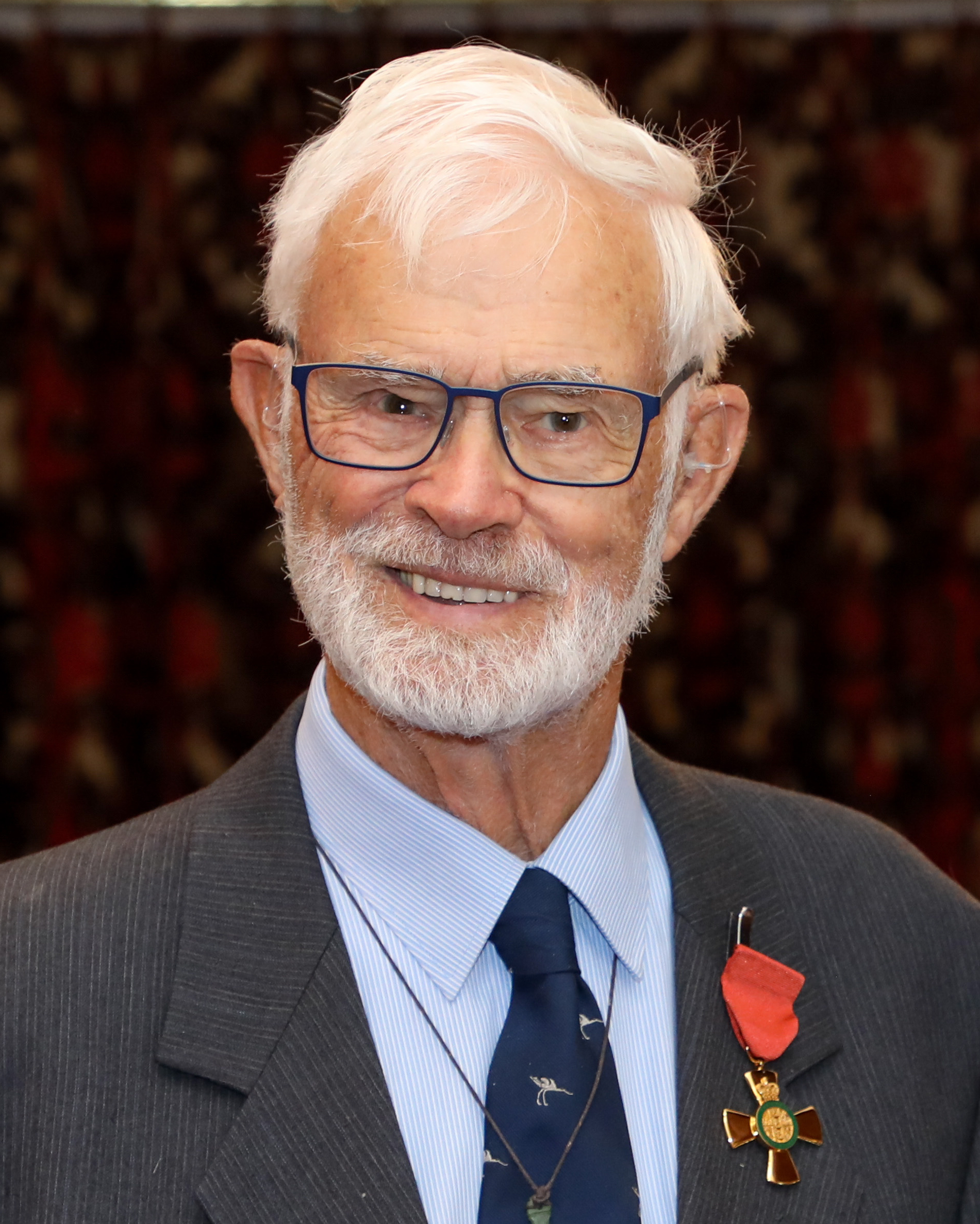
John Darby

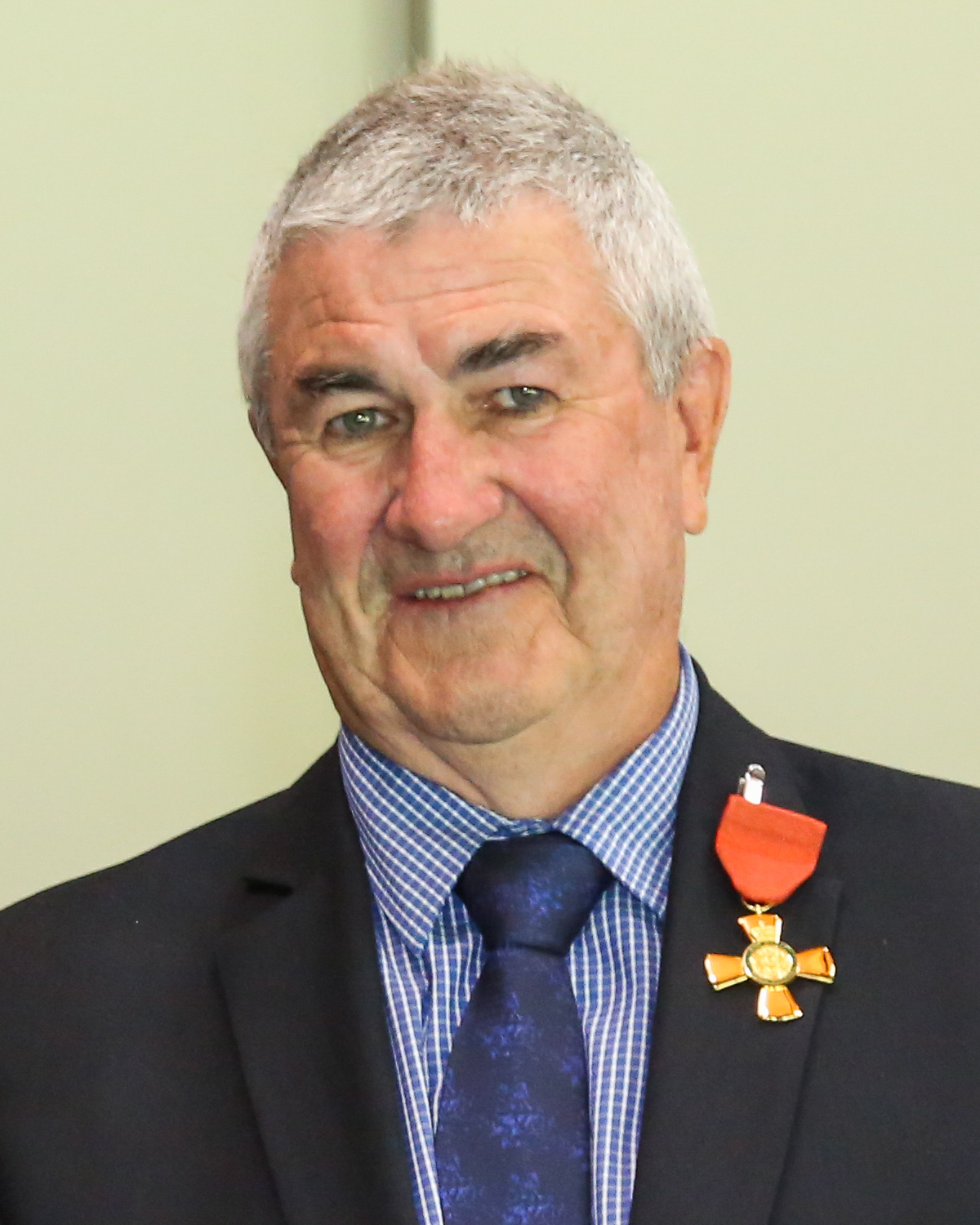
Brian Donnelly

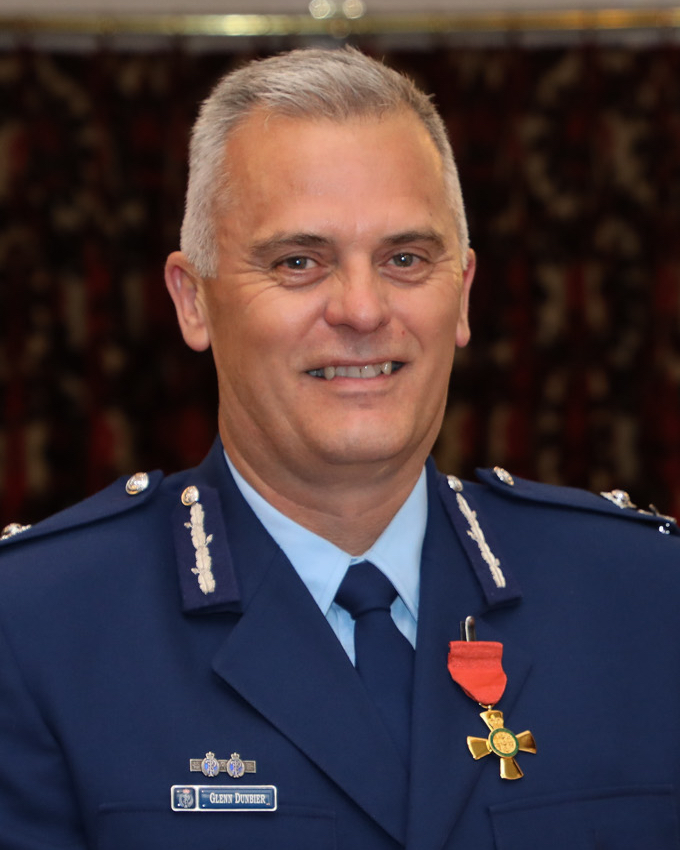
Glenn Dunbier

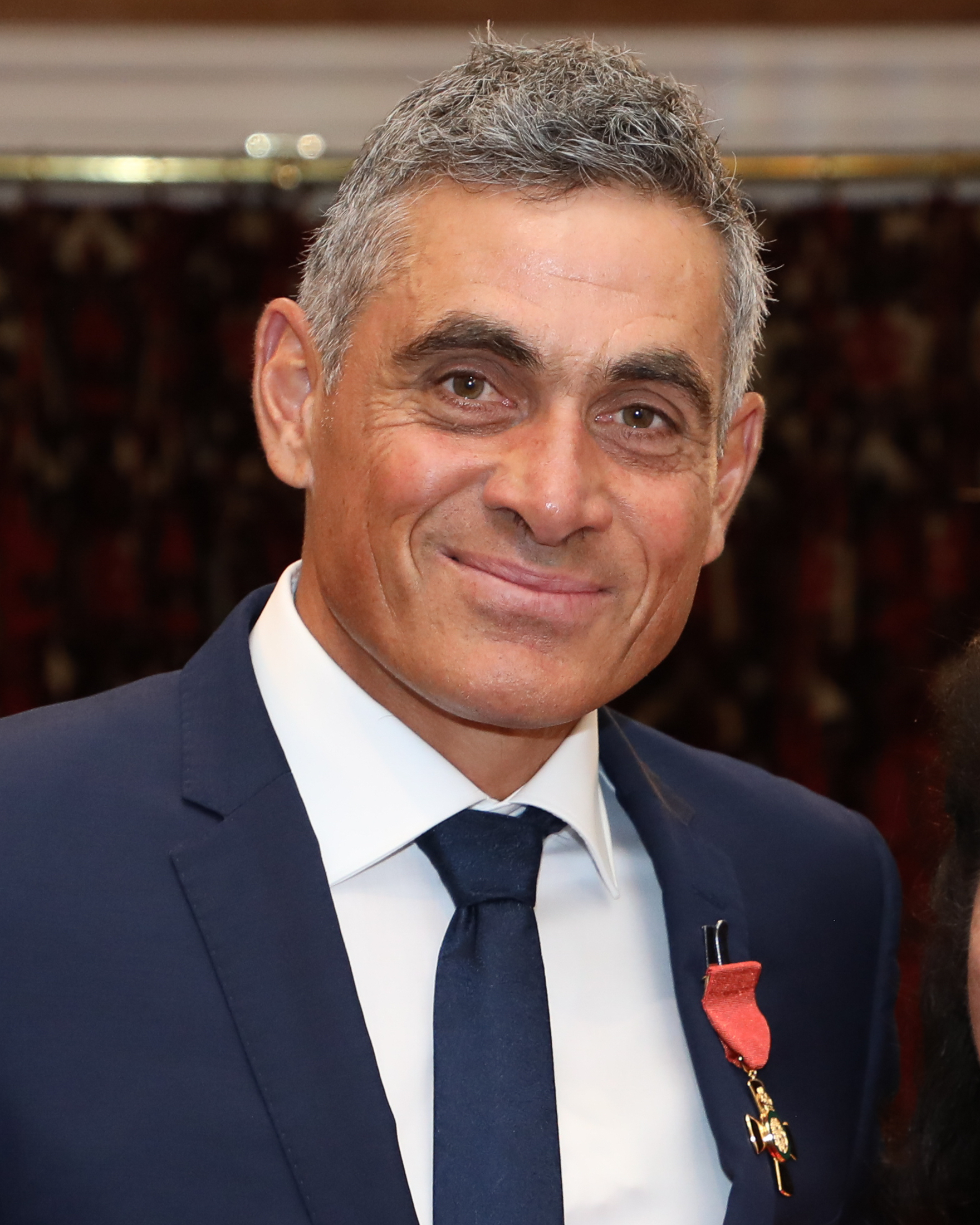
Nathan Fa'avae

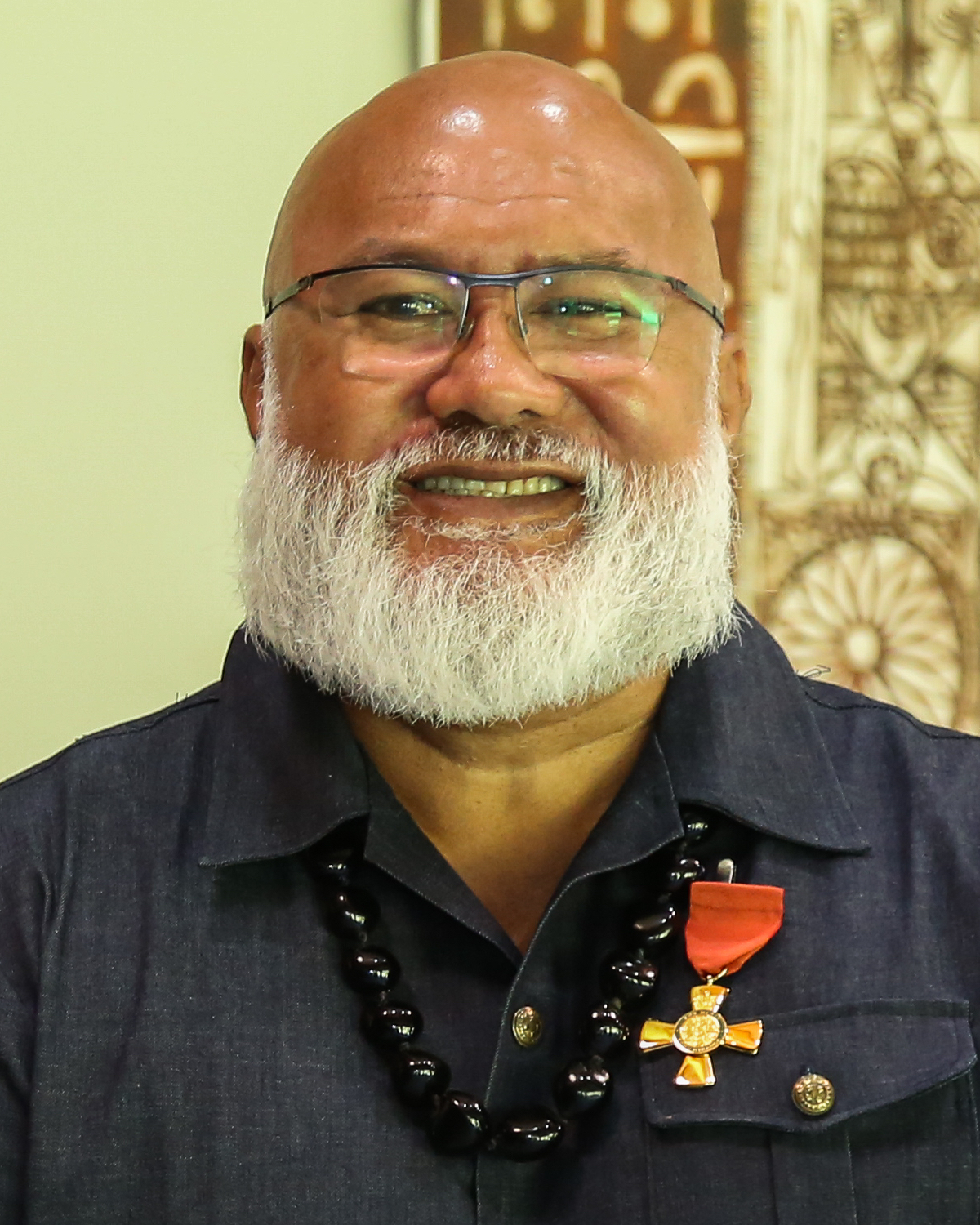
David Fane

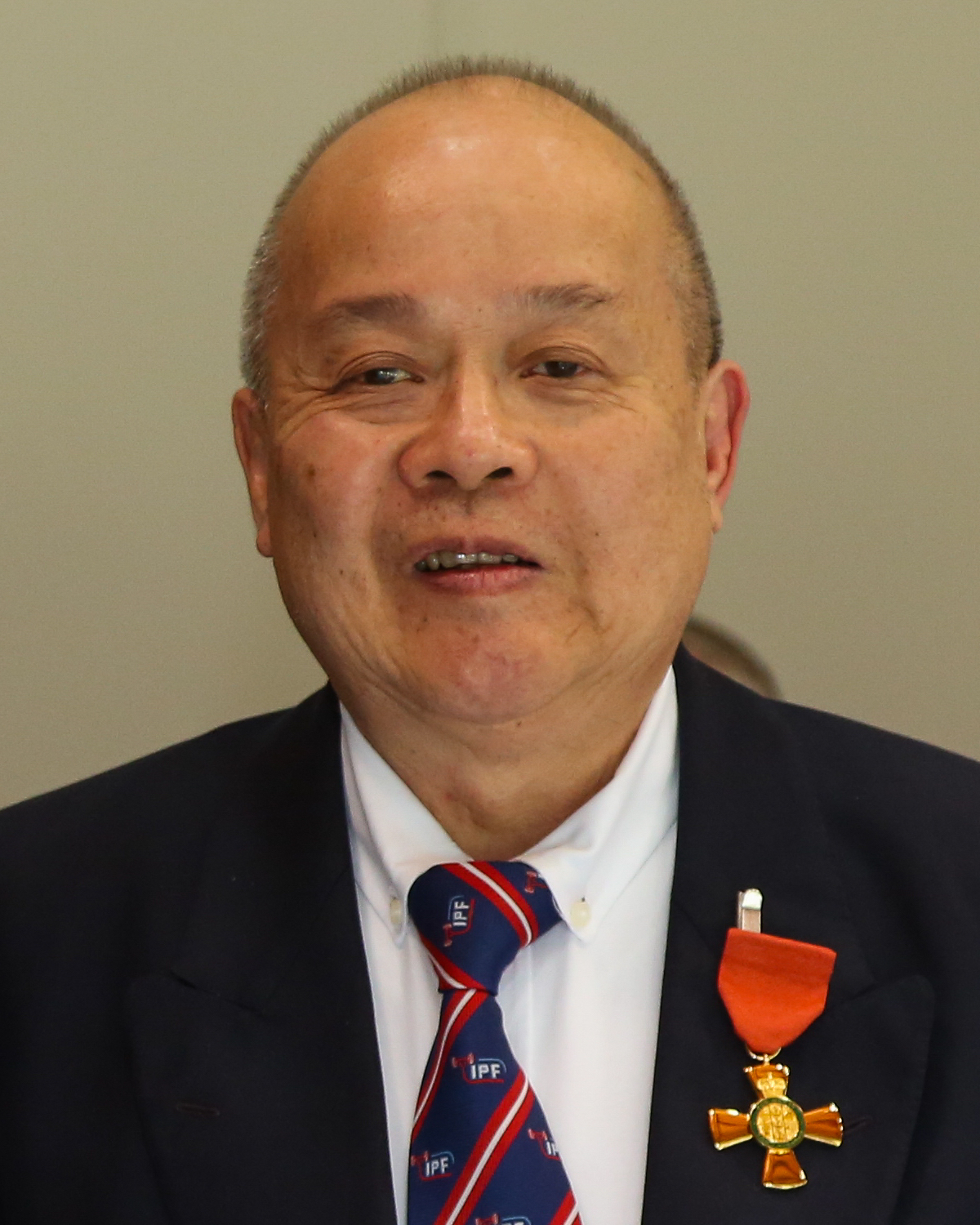
Grahame Fong

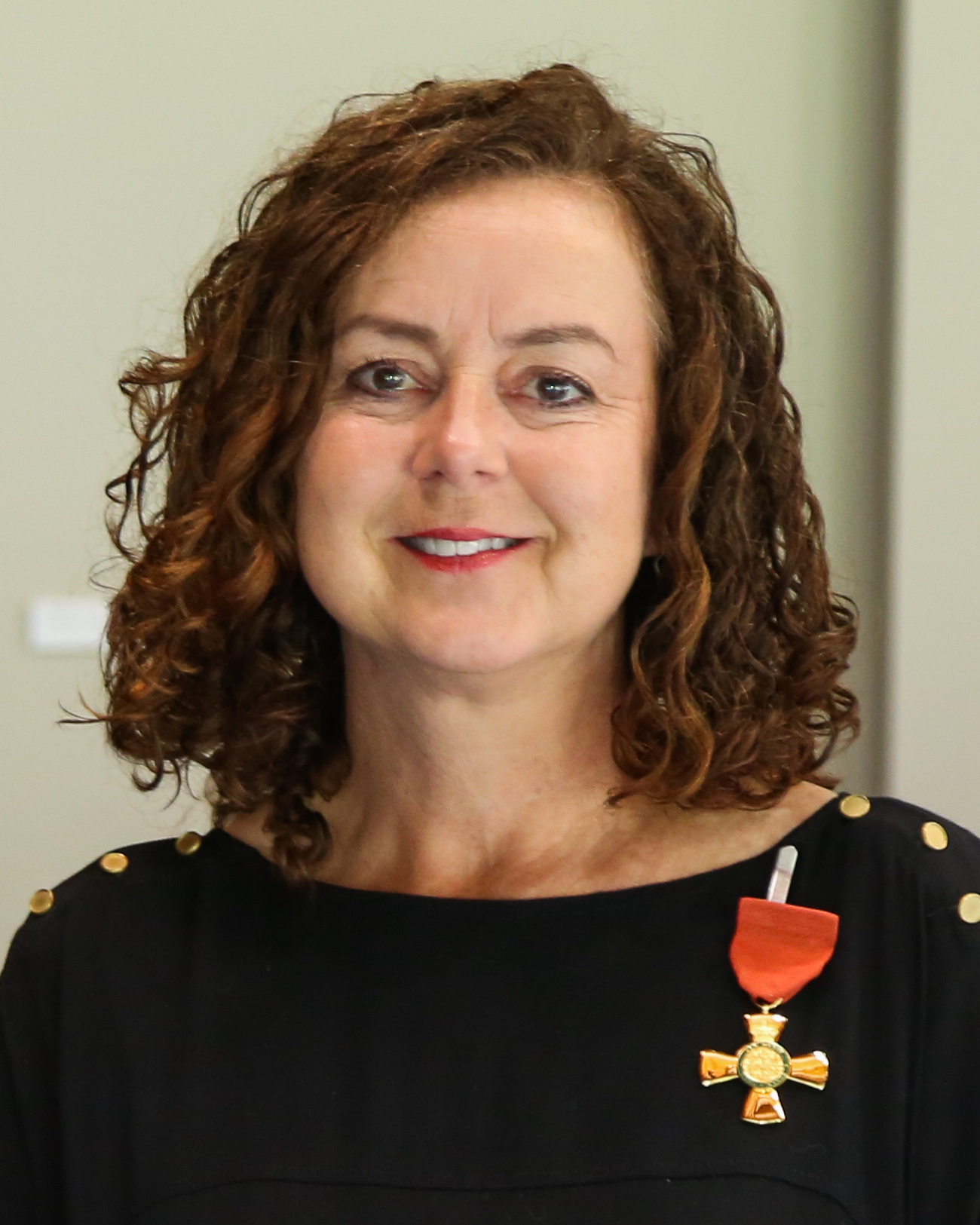
Natalie Gauld

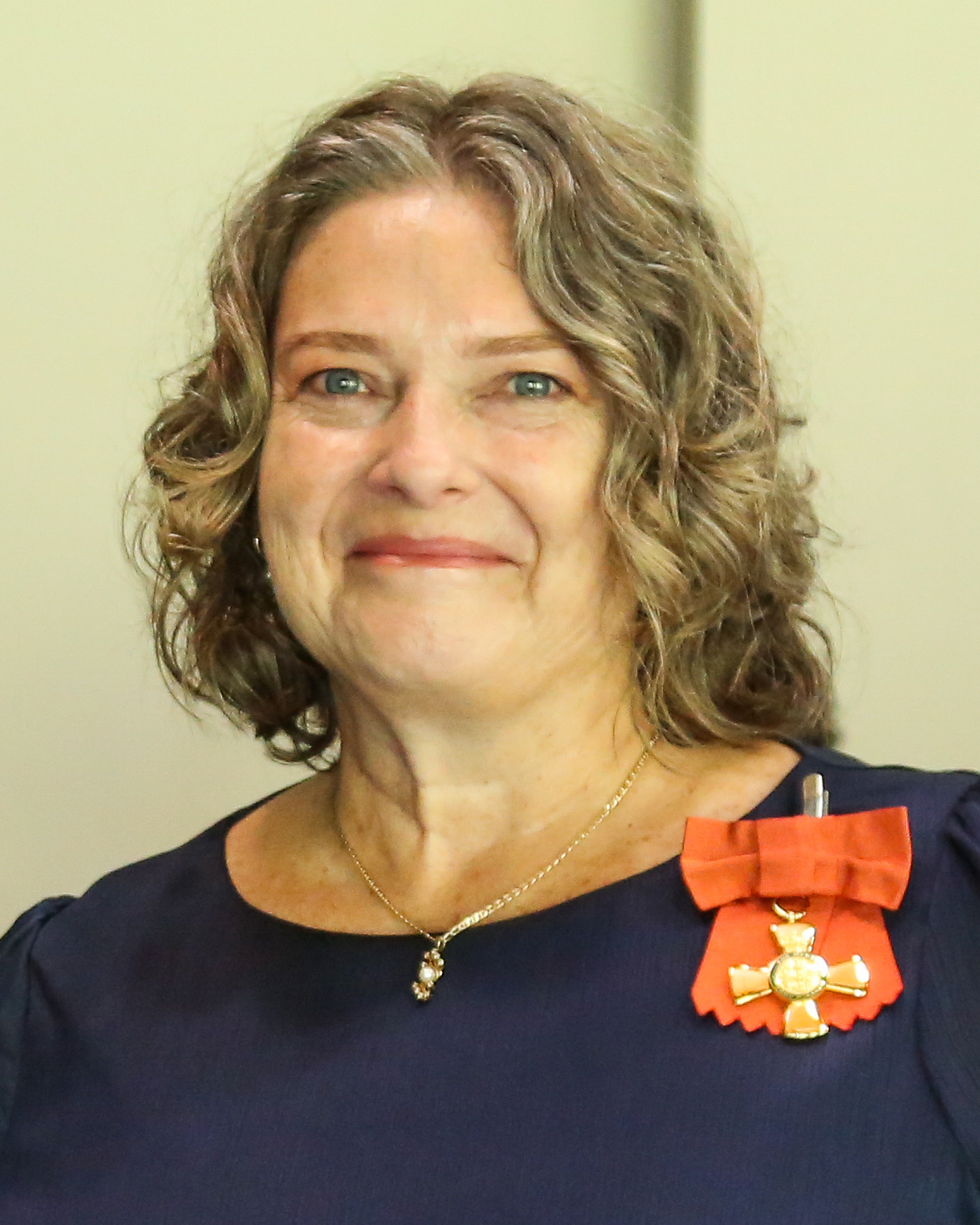
Joanne Gibbs

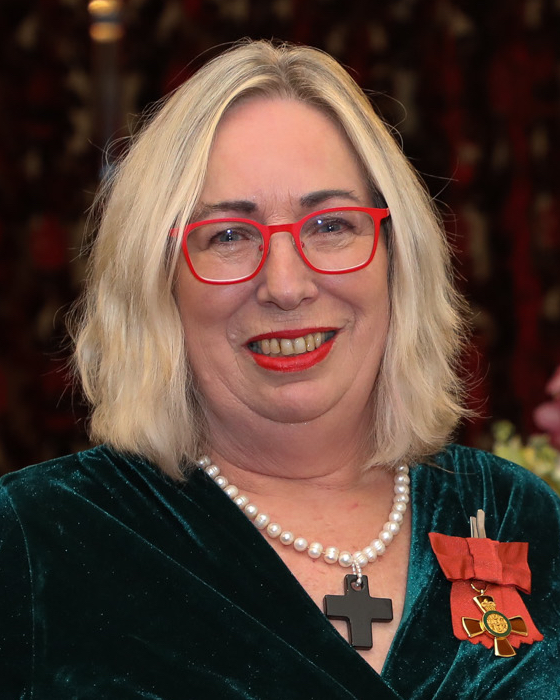
Cindy Johns

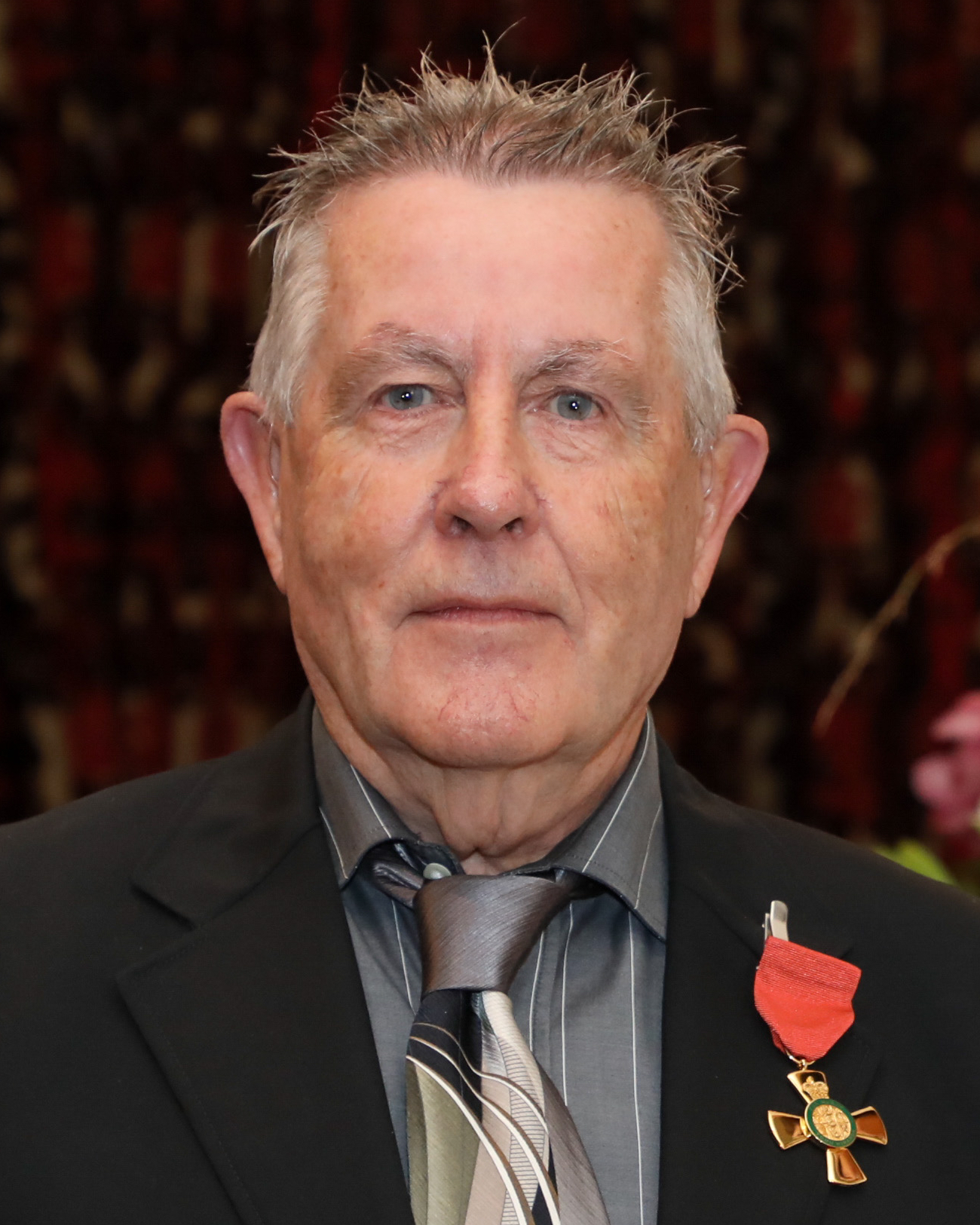
Ian MacEwan

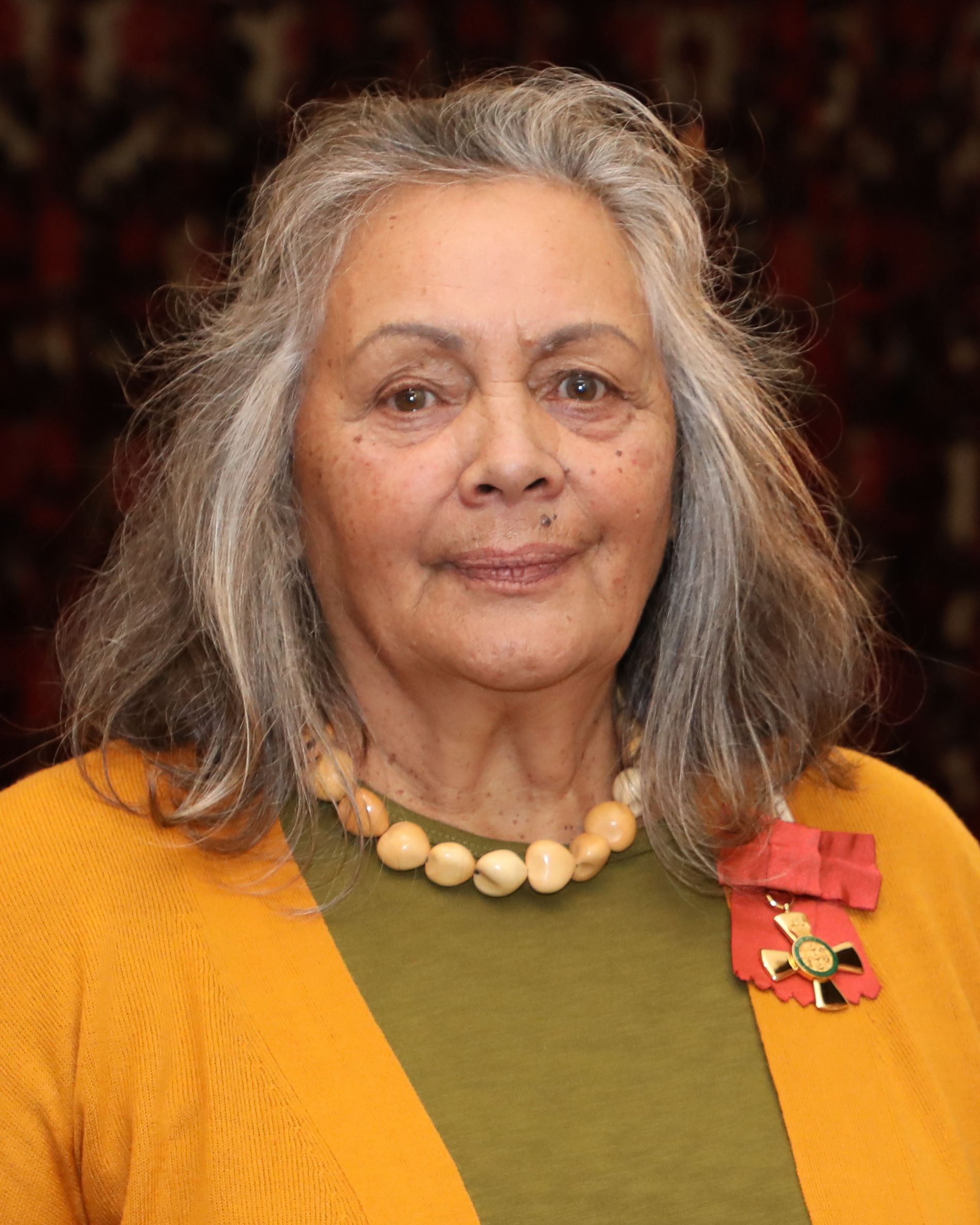
Te Haumihiata Mason

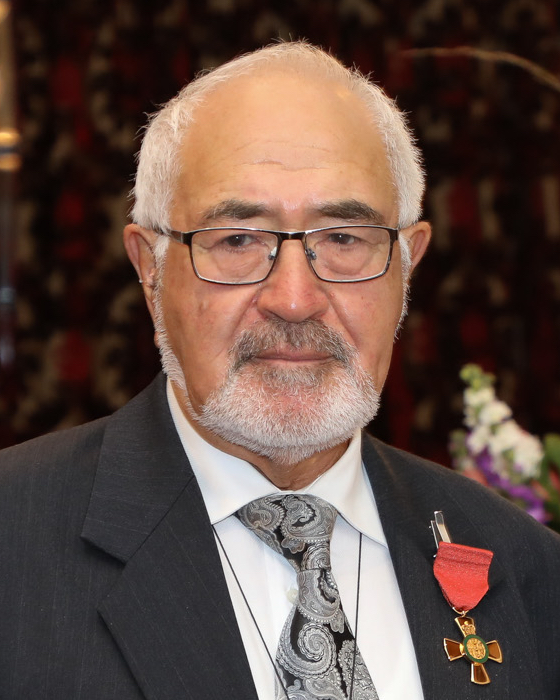
Waihaere Mason

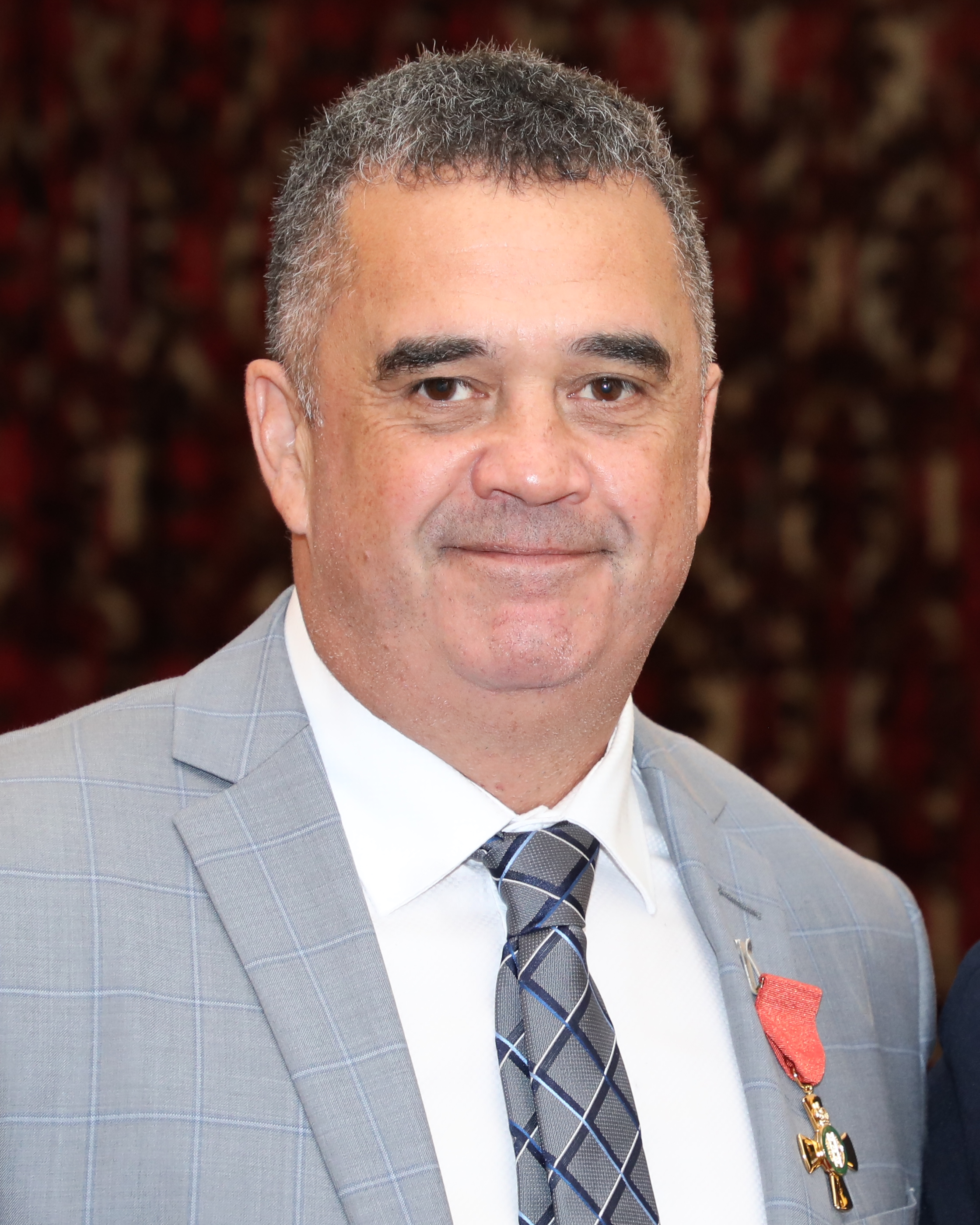
Rangi Mātāmua

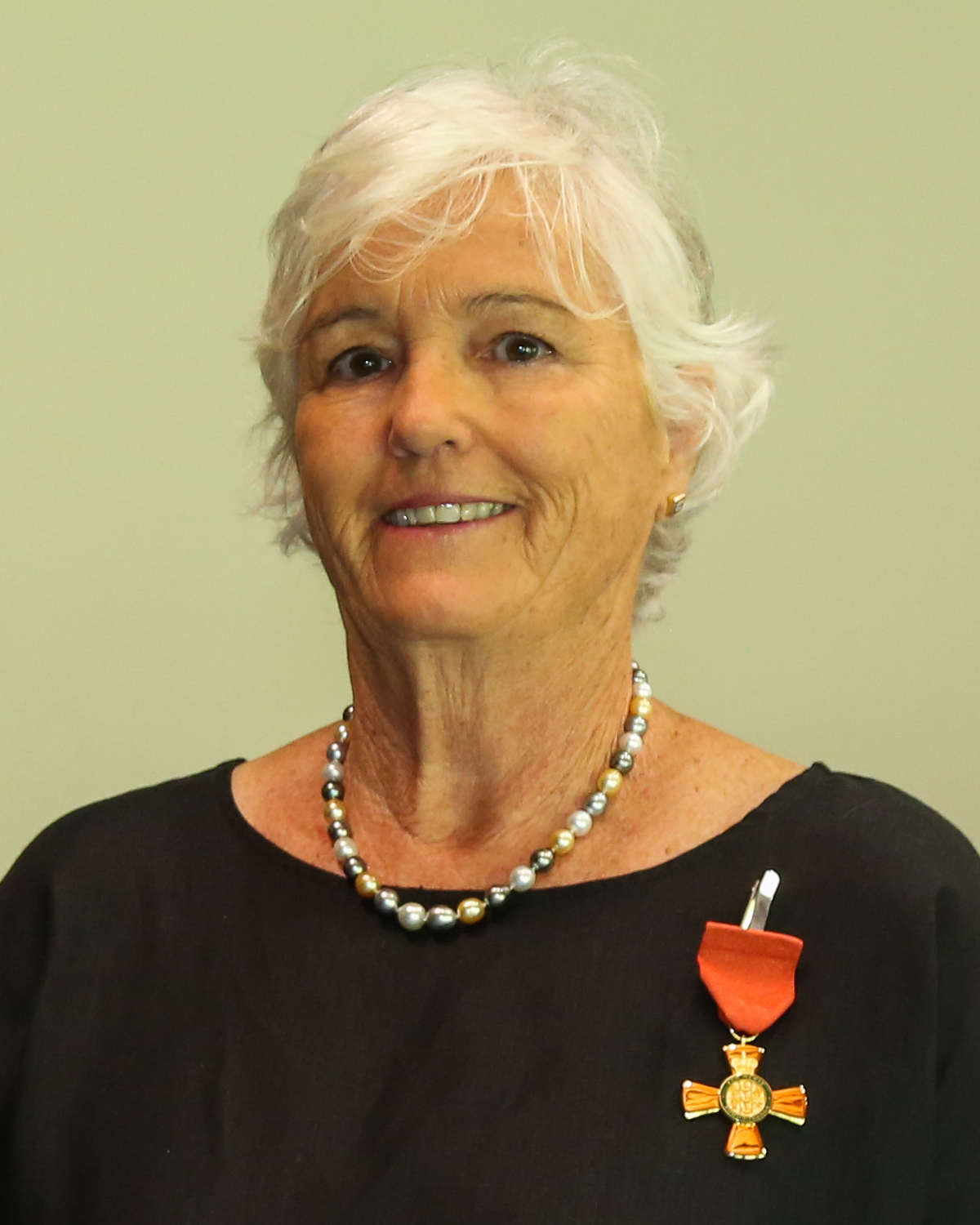
Anita Mazzoleni

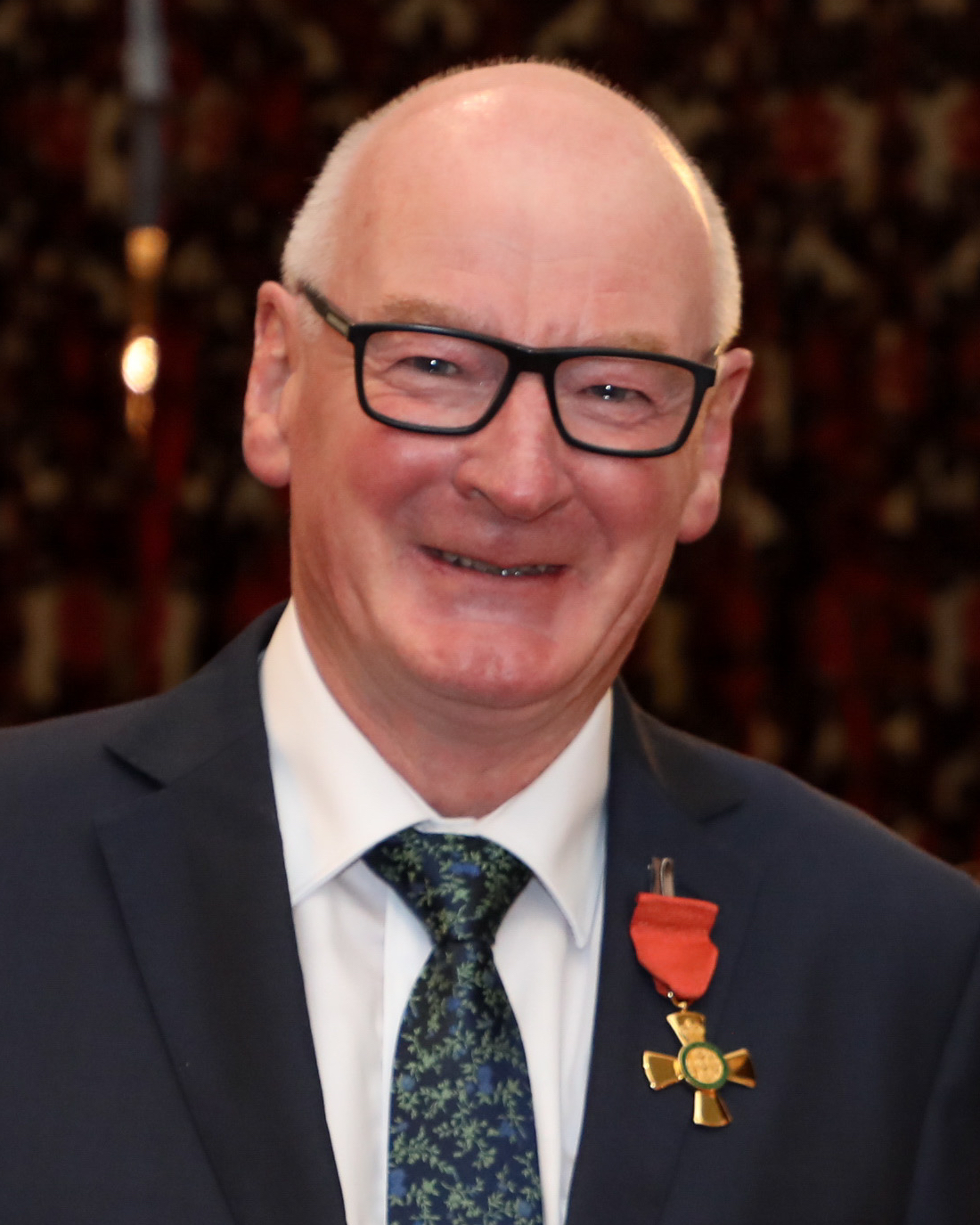
Bernie McKone

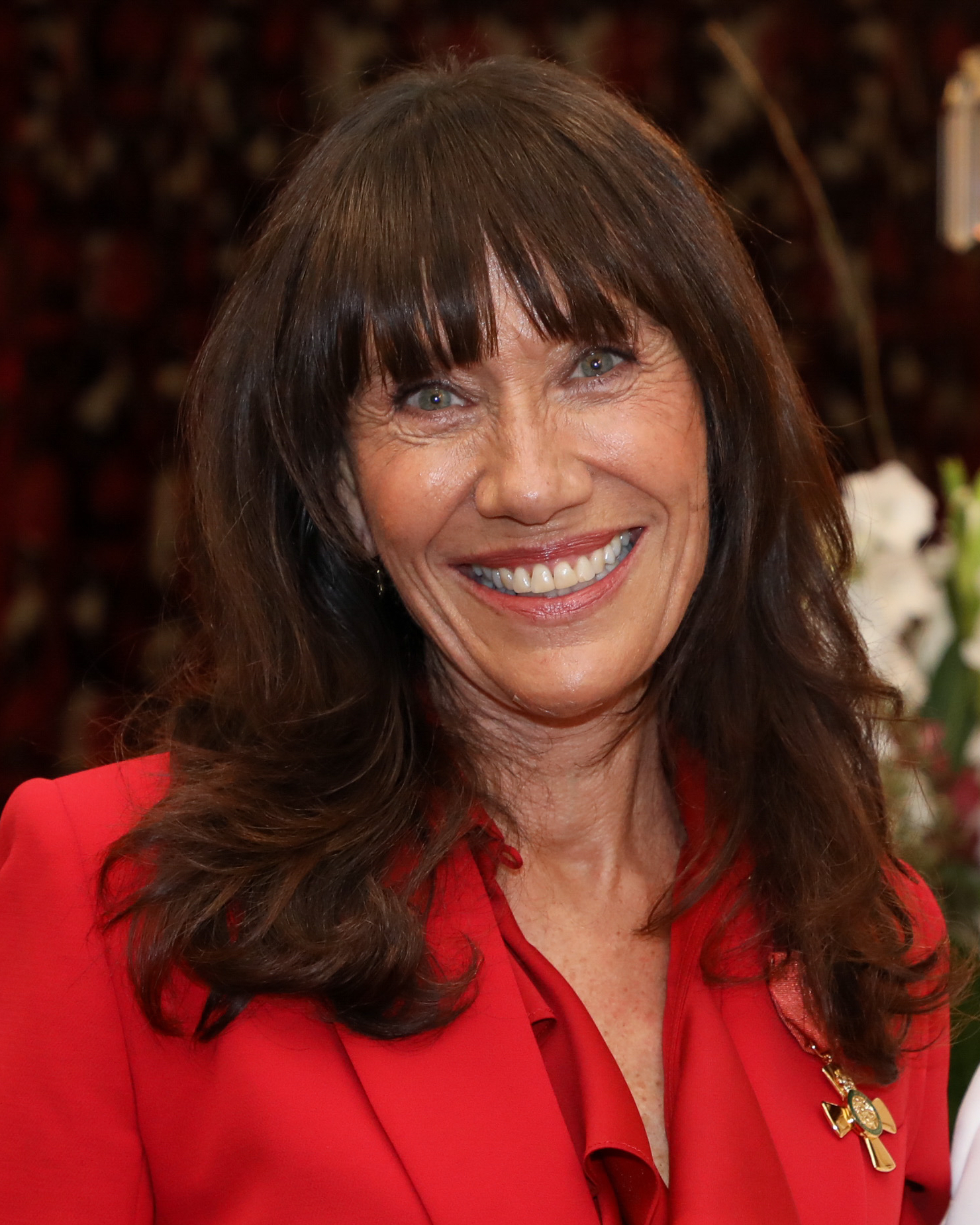
Janine Morrell‑Gunn

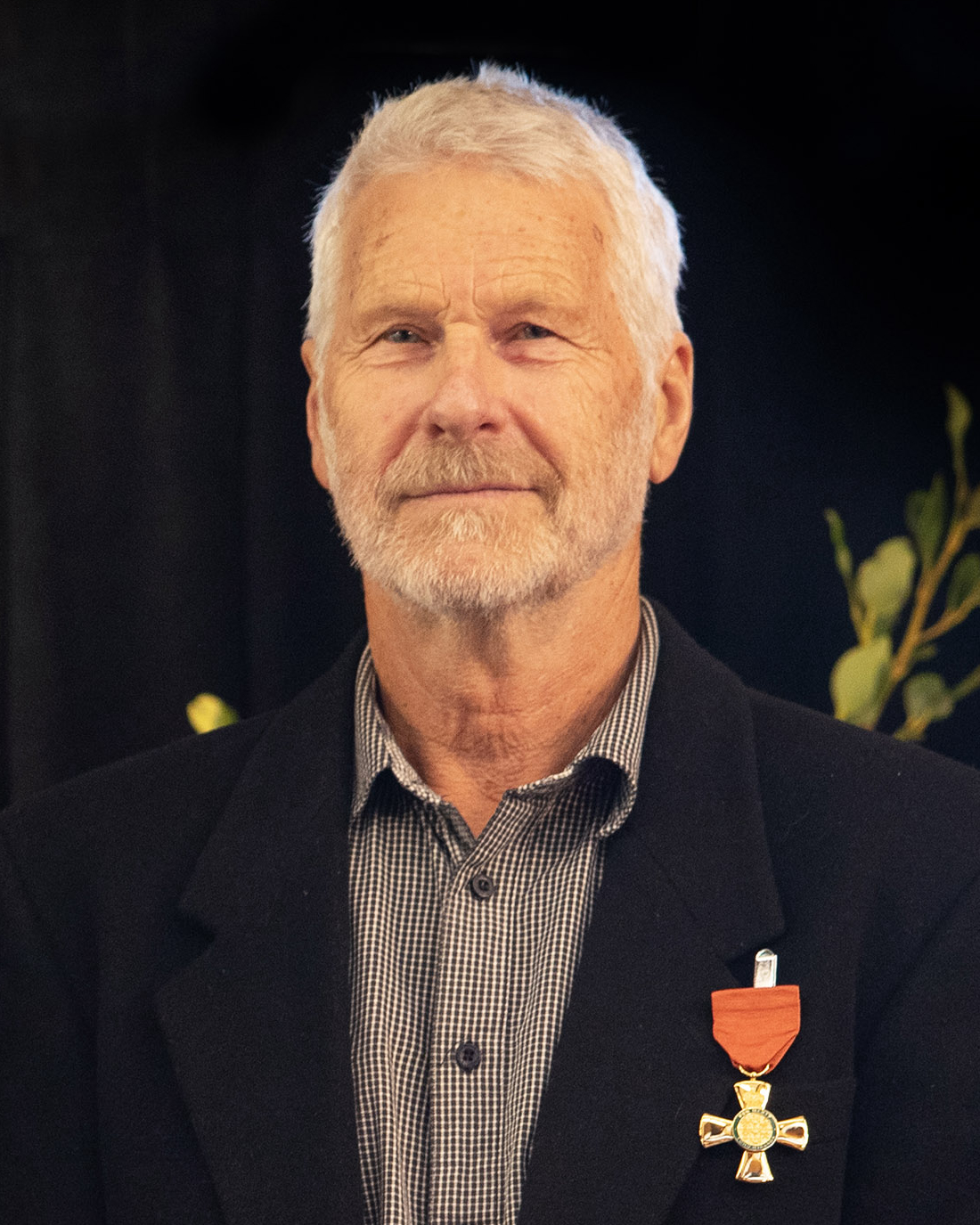
Don Mortensen

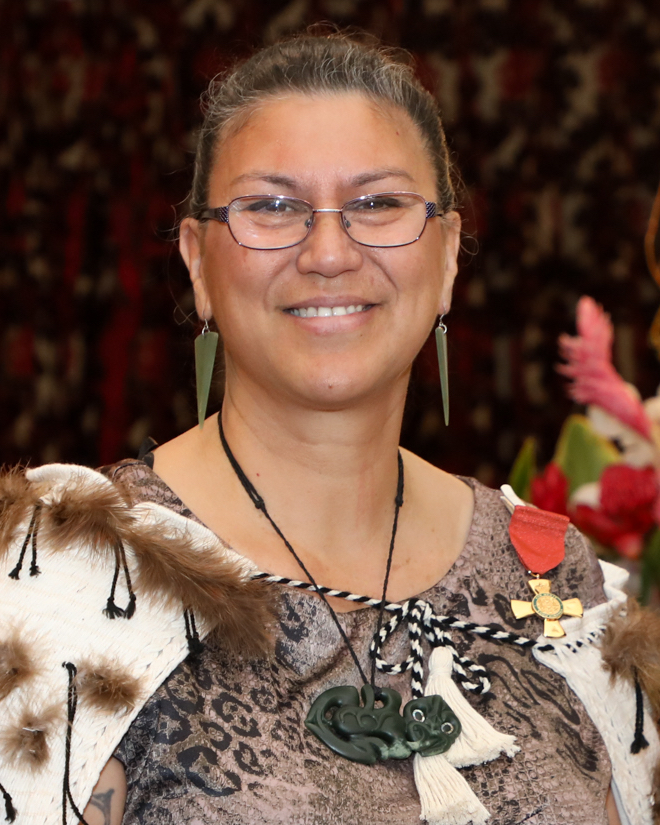
Pānia Papa

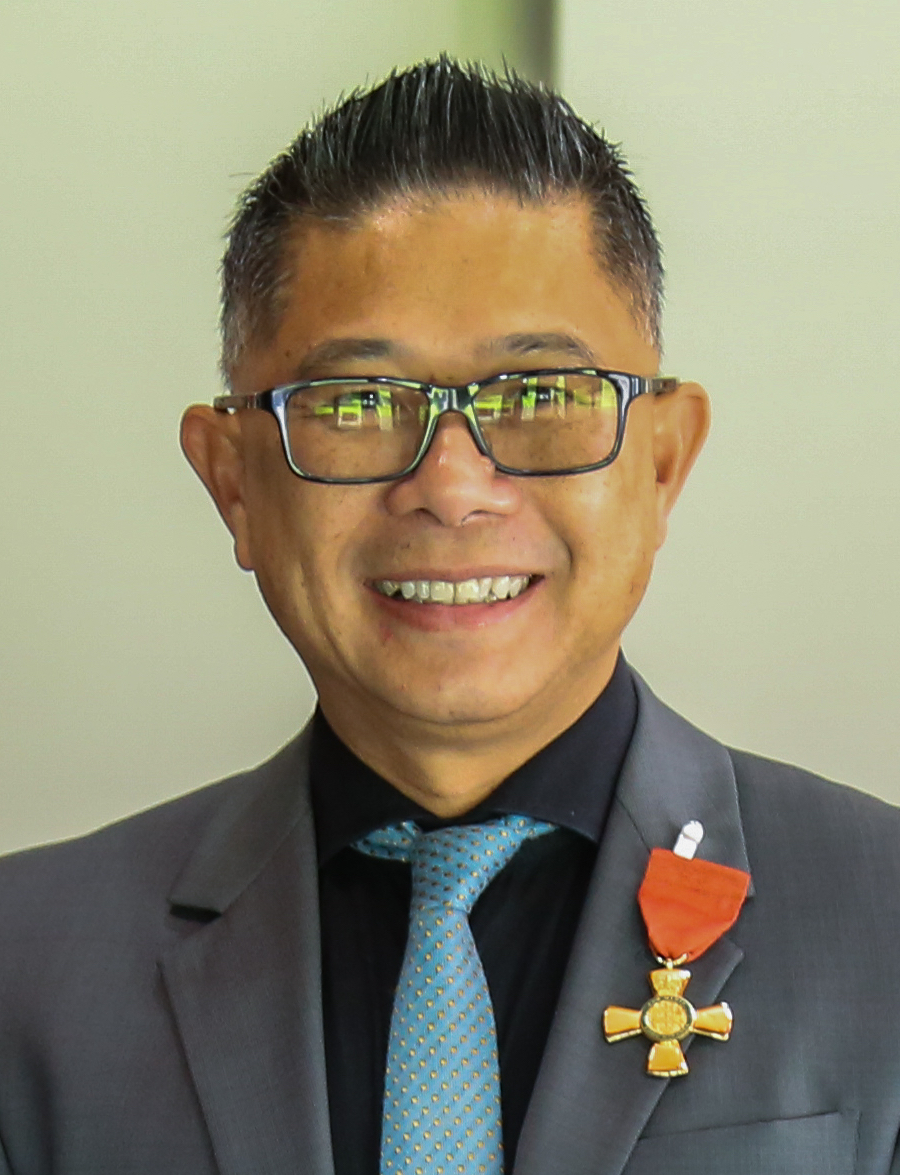
Mitchell Pham

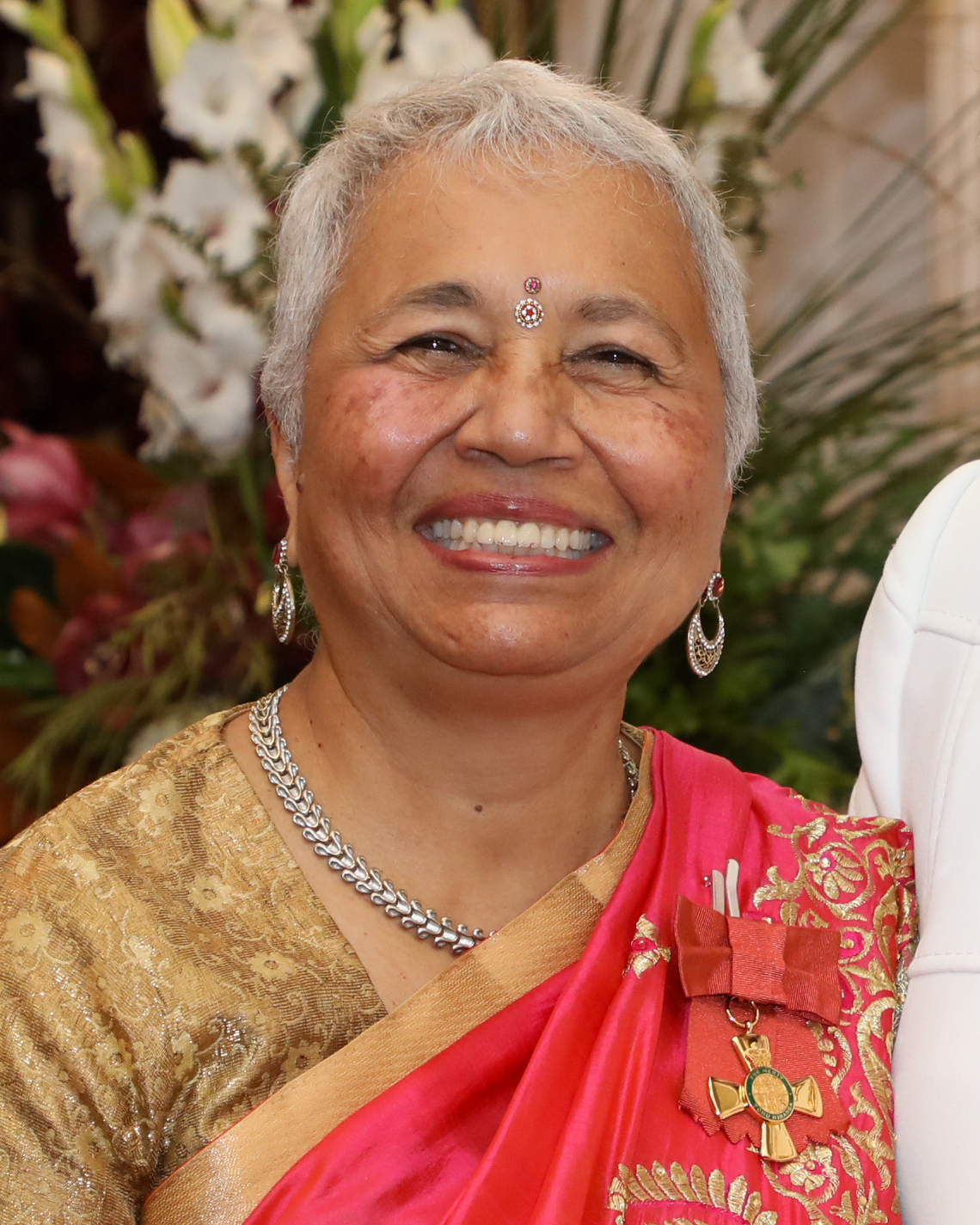
Edwina Pio

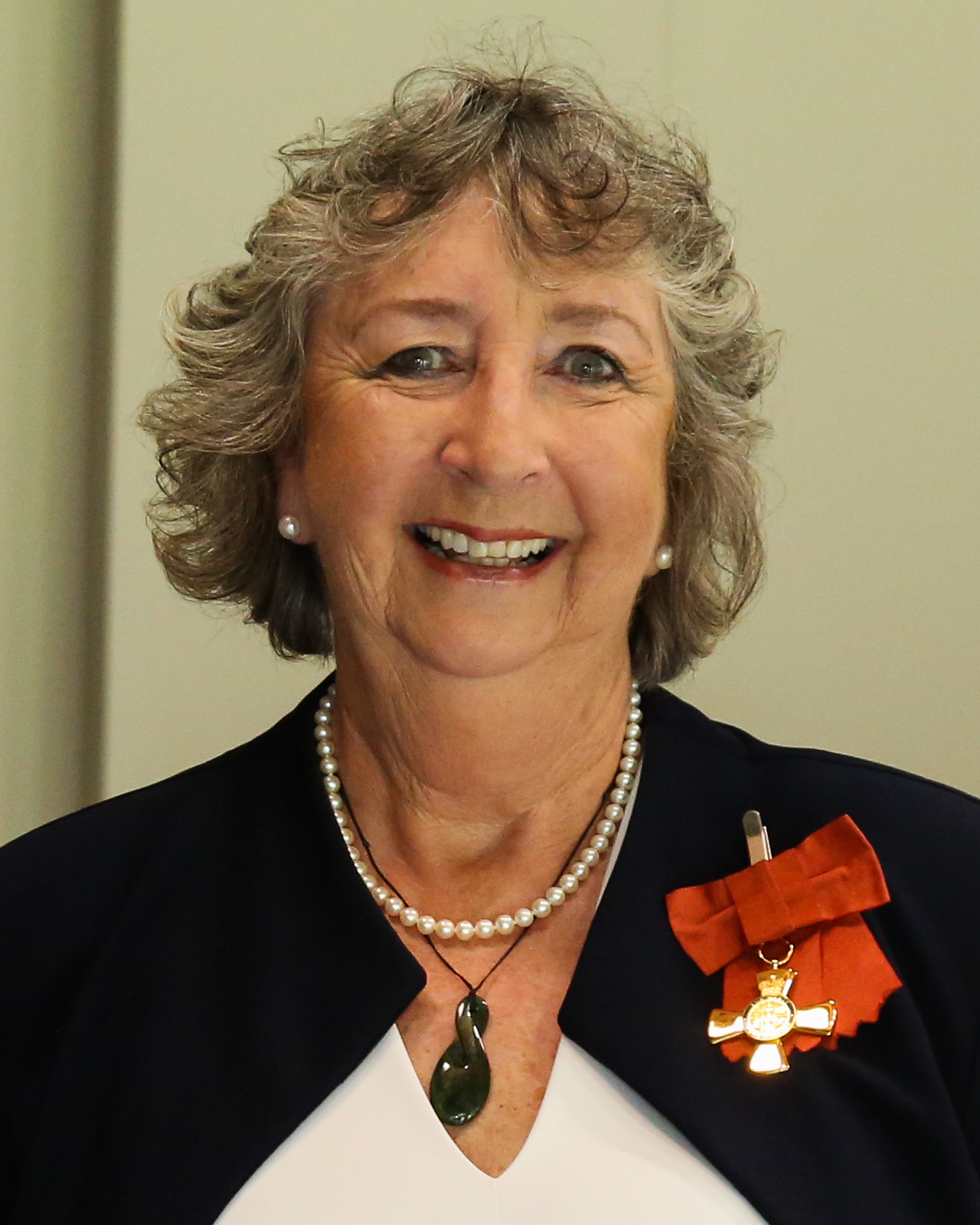
Christine Rogan

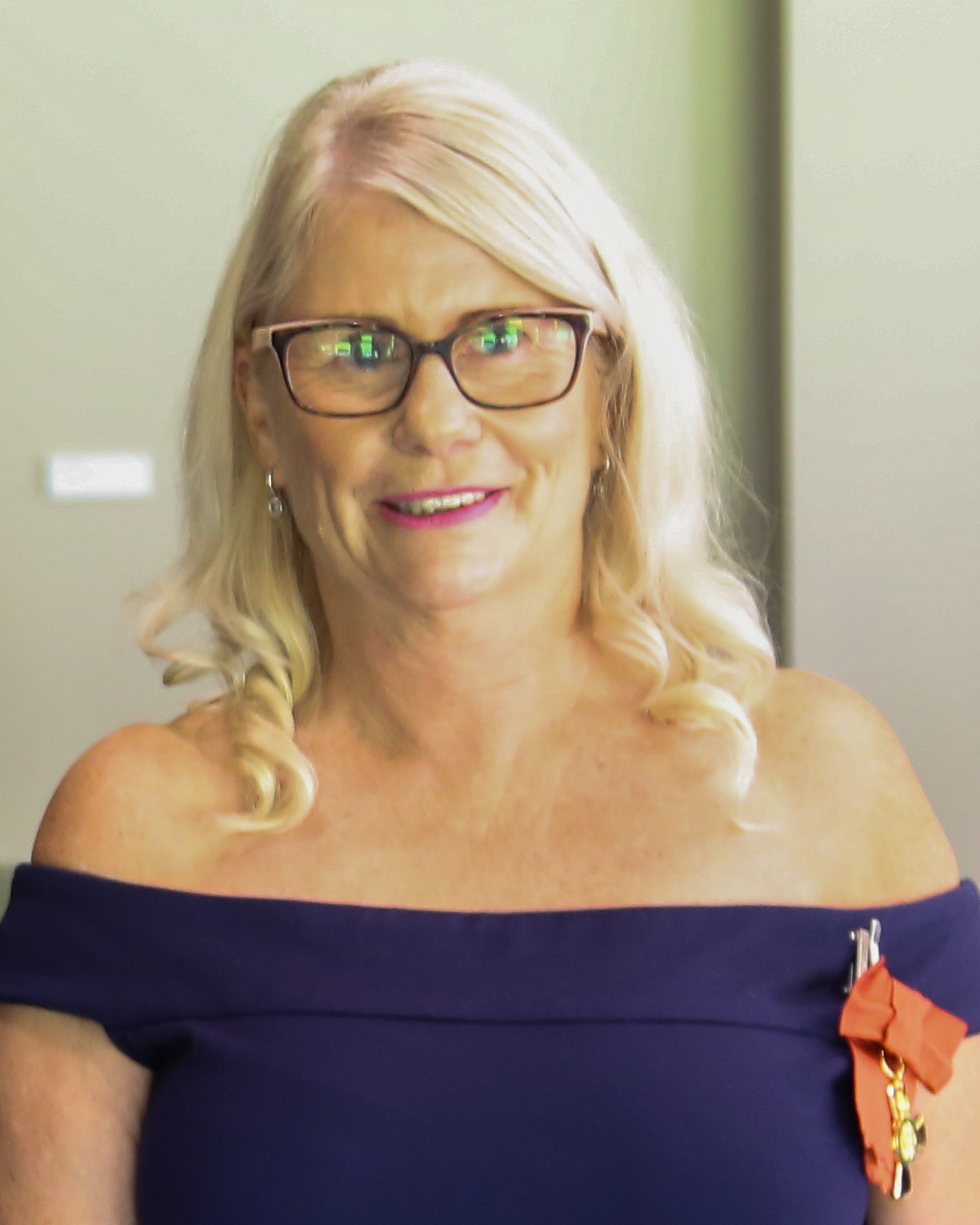
Nicola Smith‑Guerin

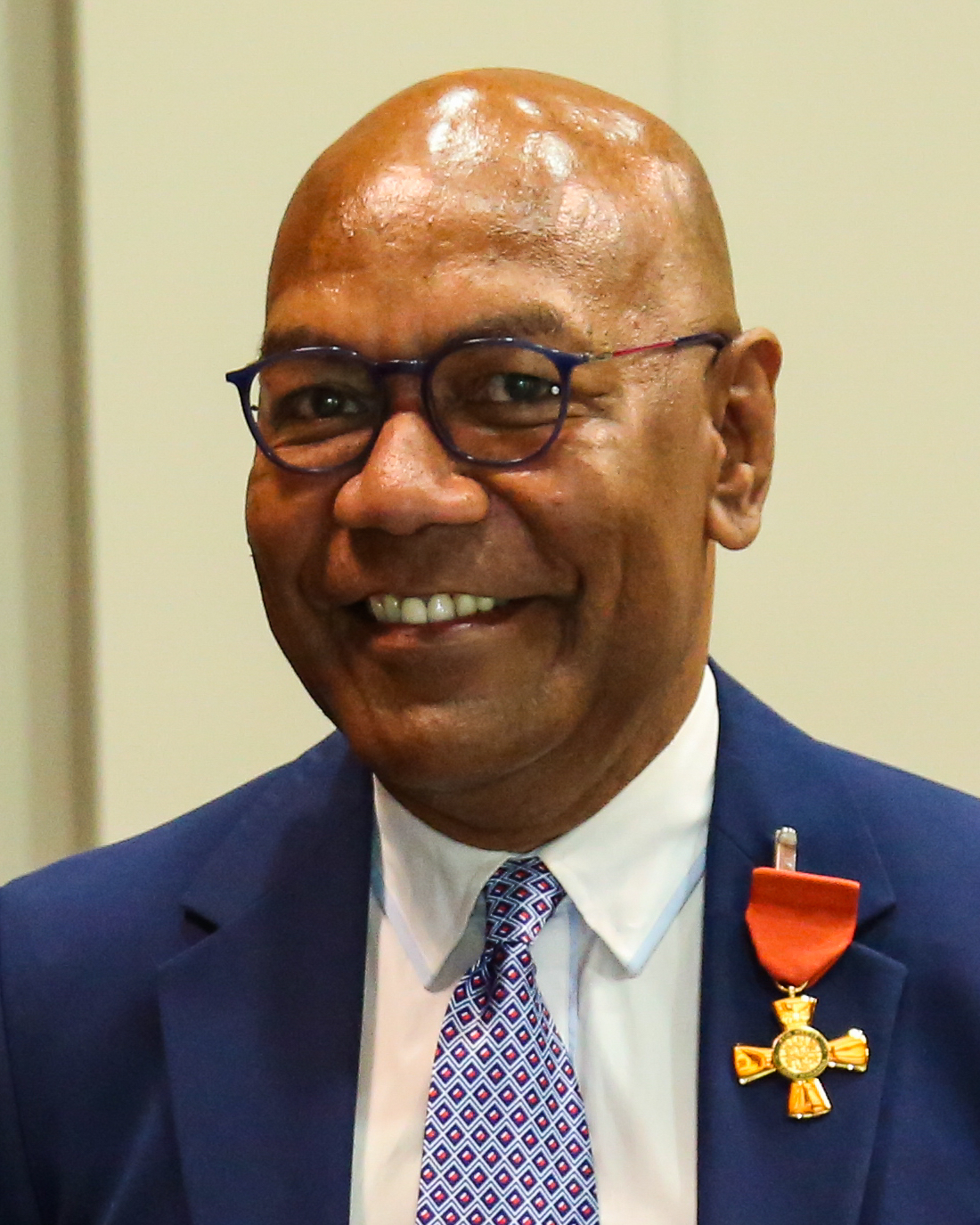
Api Talemaitoga

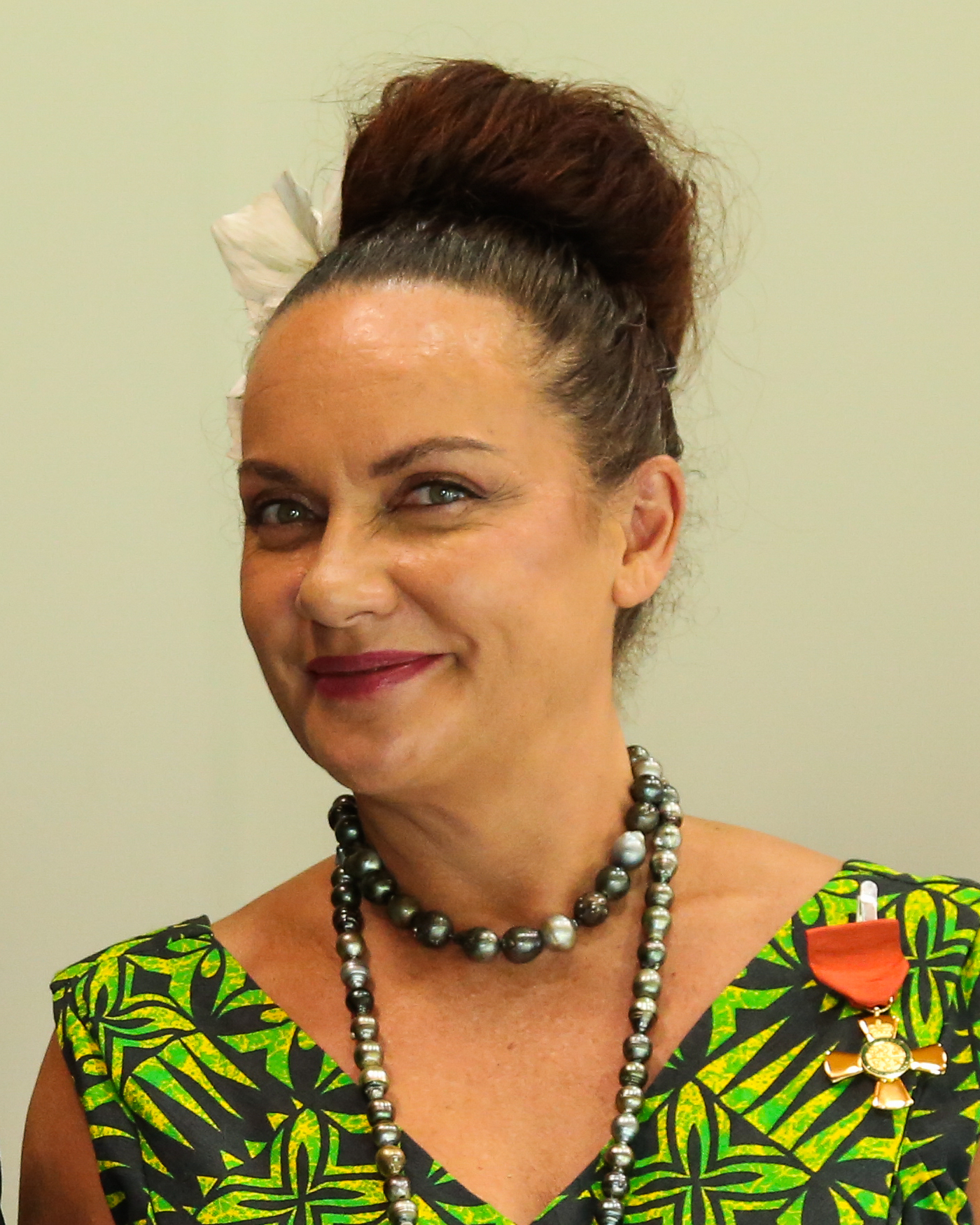
Lisa Taouma

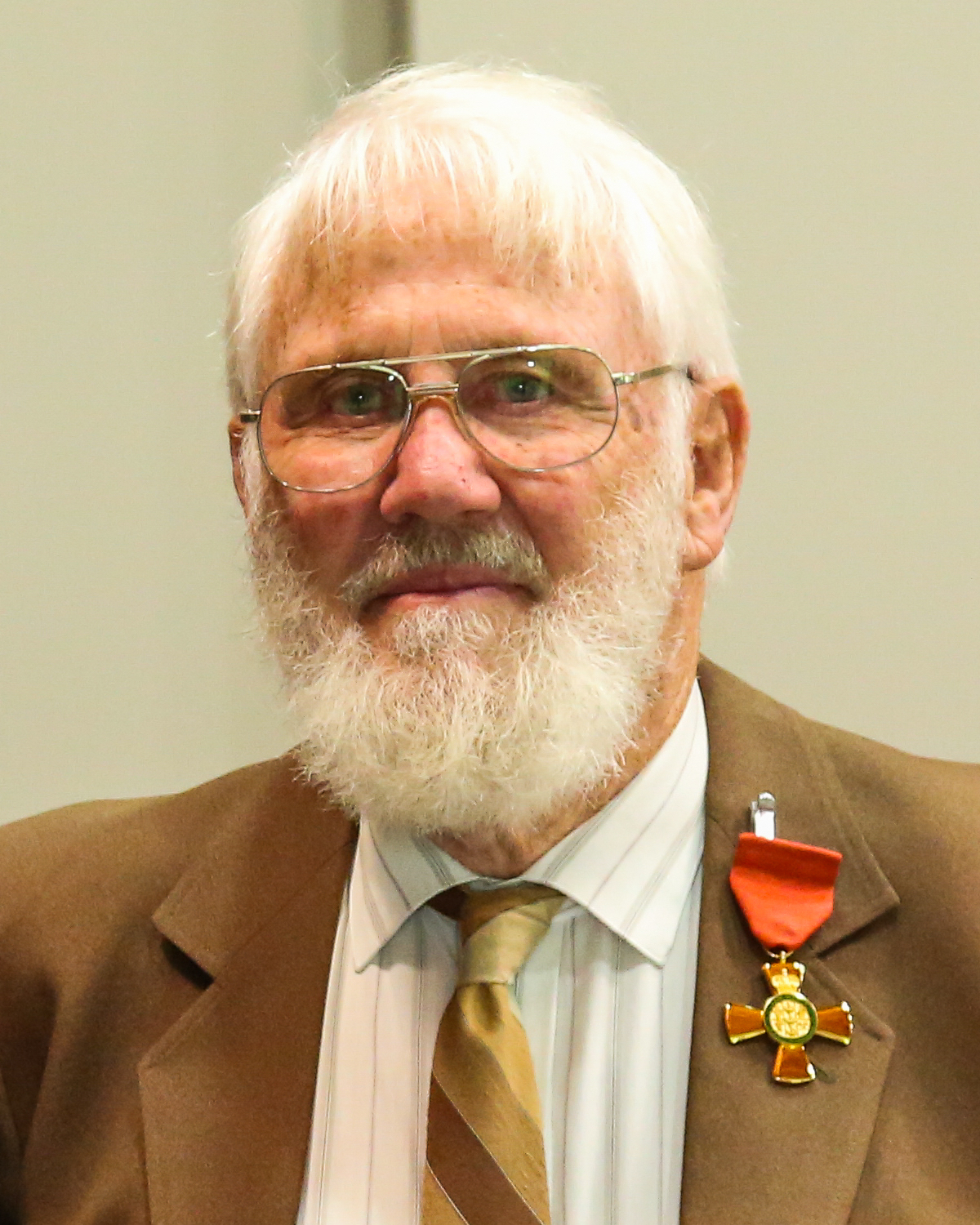
Dick Veitch

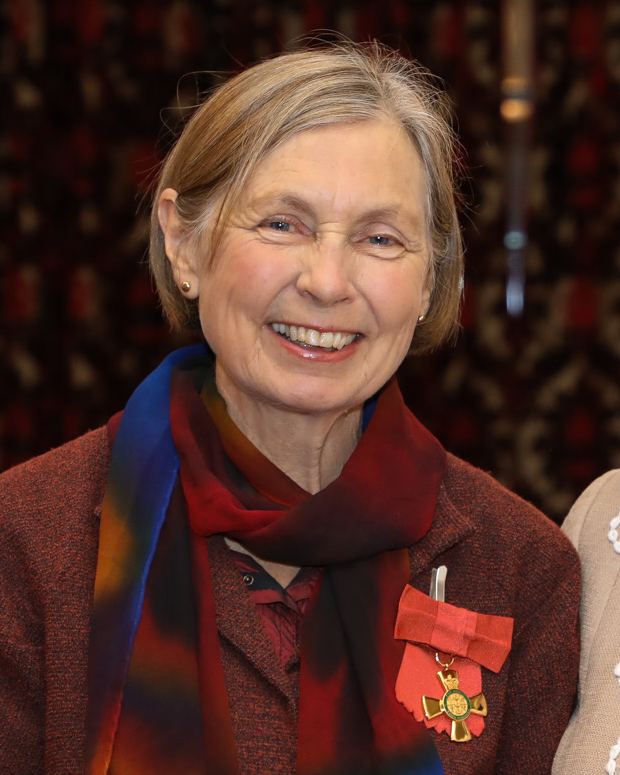
Kath Walker

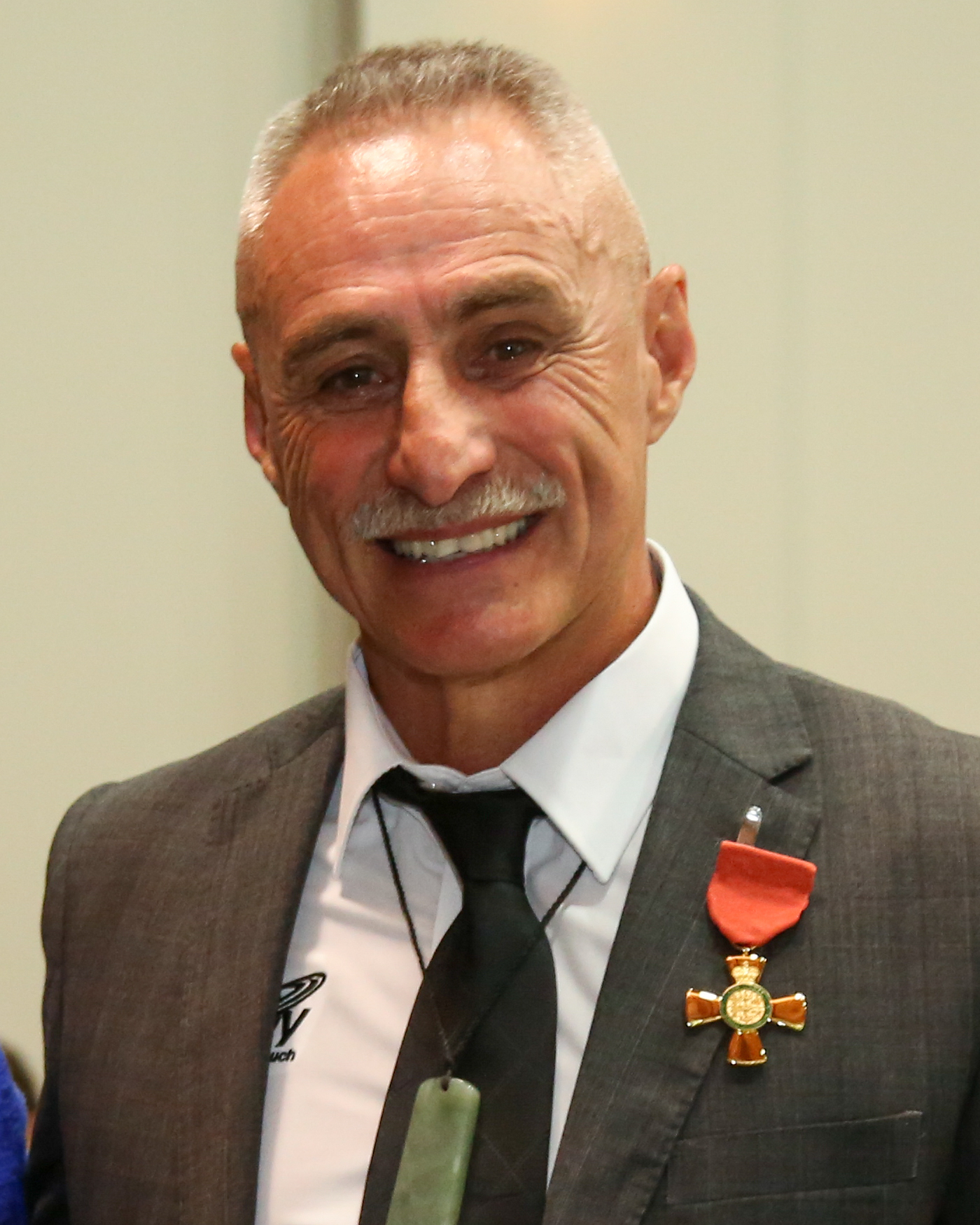
Peter Walters

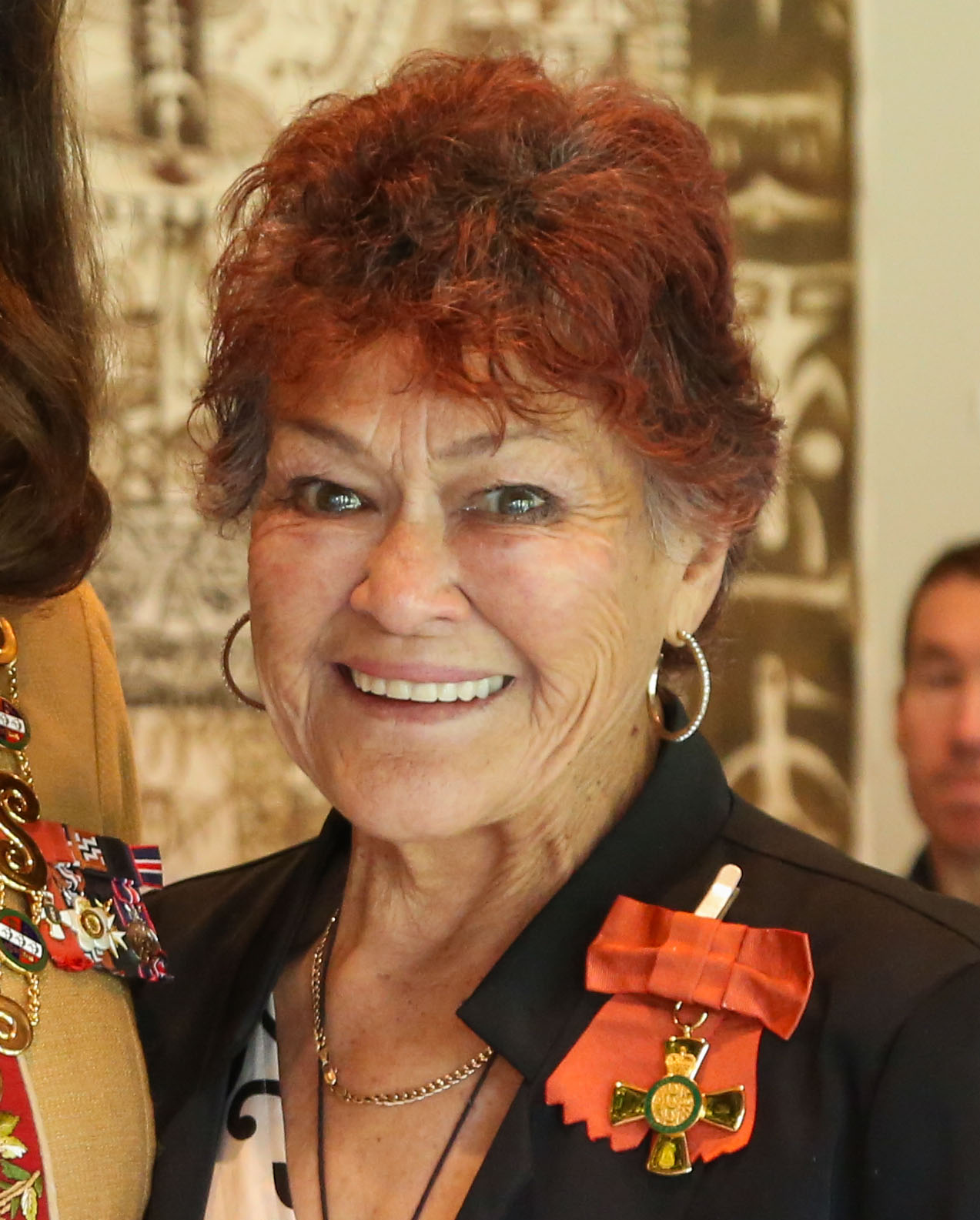
Paula Werohia‑Lloyd

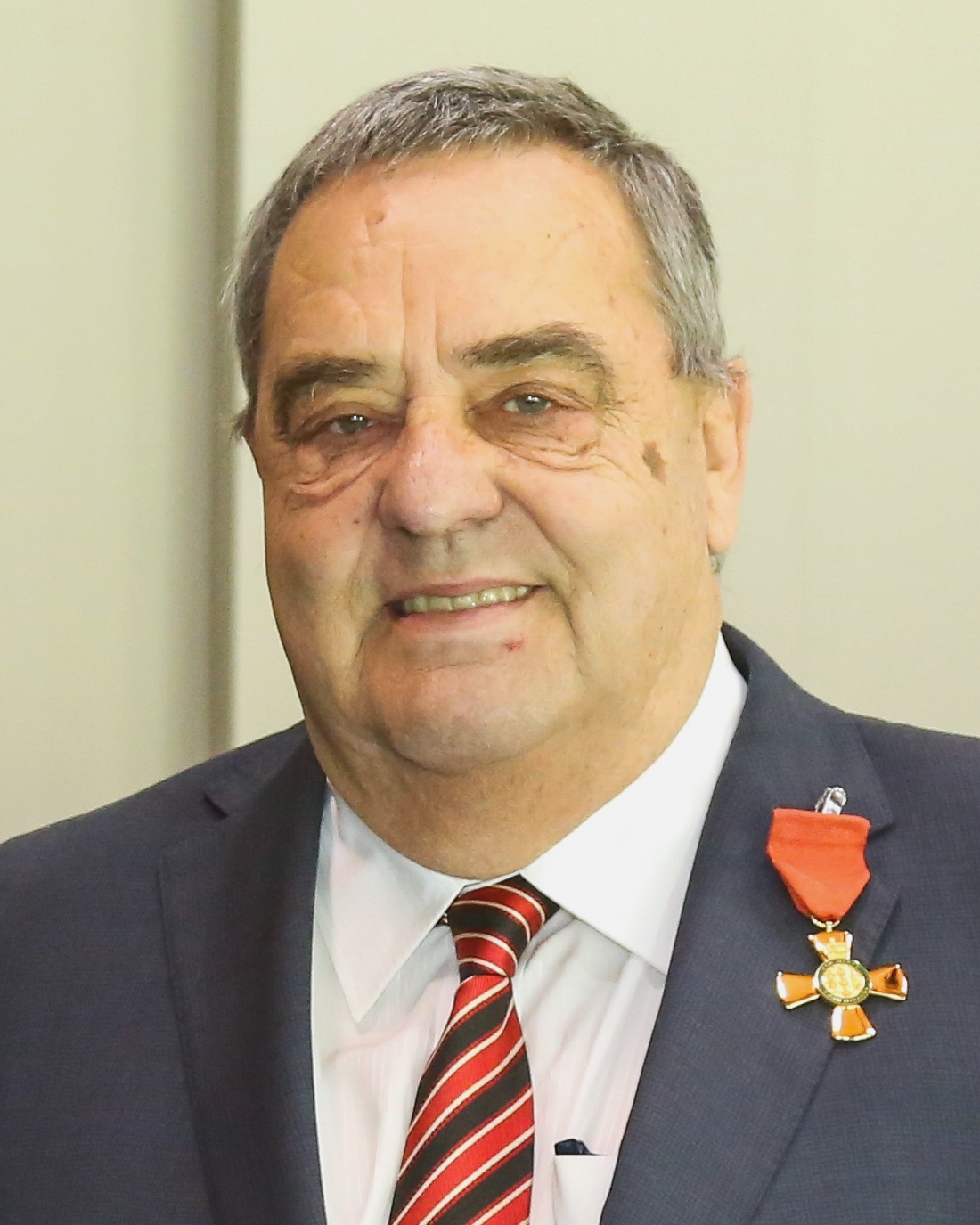
Mike Williams

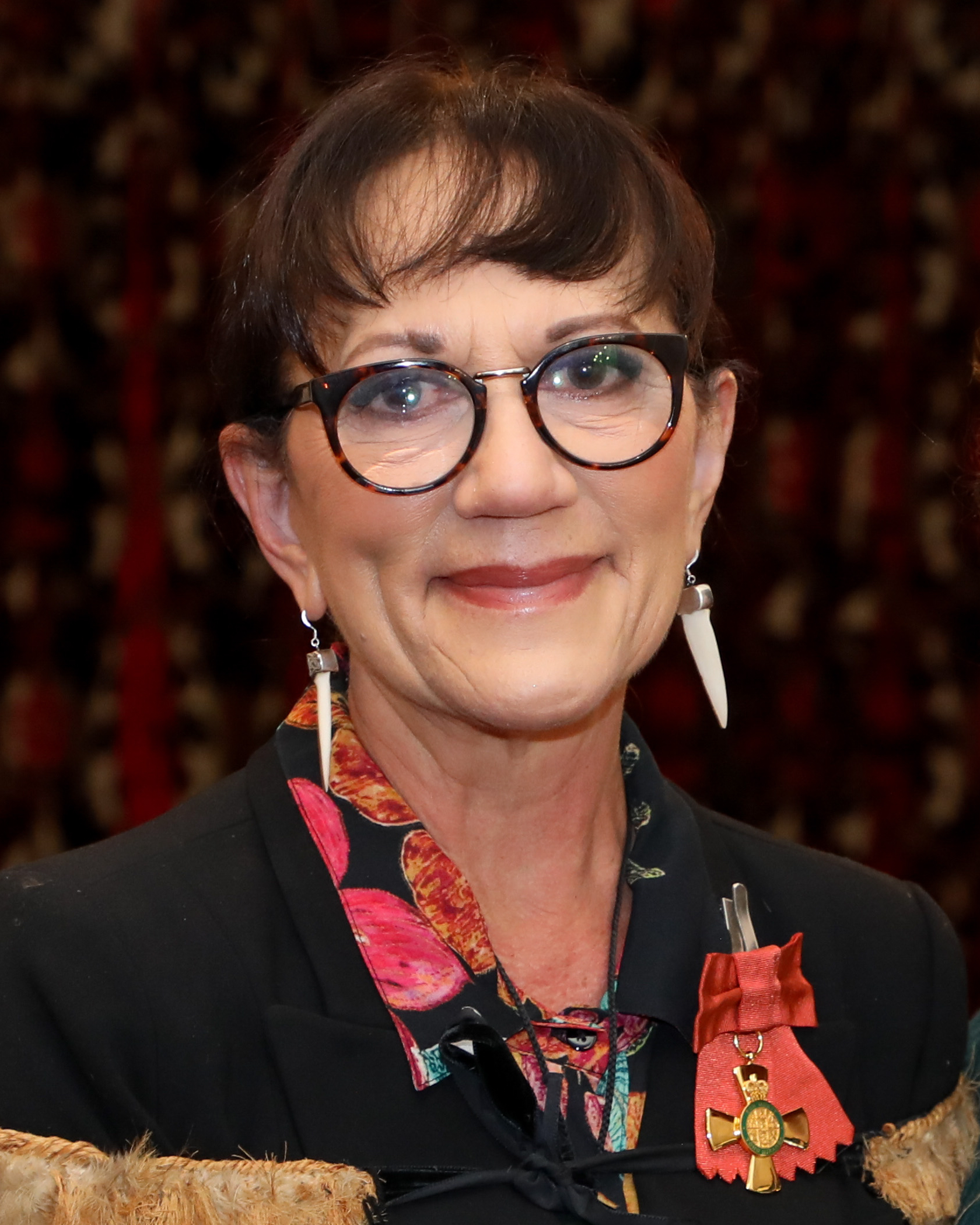
Te Puea Winiata

=== Member (MNZM) ===
- Dr Hafsa Ahmed – of Lincoln. For services to ethnic communities and women.
- Wendy Allison – of Featherston. For services to drug harm reduction.
- Dr John Douglas Armstrong – of Rotorua. For services to Māori health.
- David Wallace Bain – of Rotorua. For services to health and the community.
- Priscilla June Baken – of Feilding. For services to midwifery.
- Dr Timothy Robert Bevin – of Napier. For services to health.
- Carlton Paul Bidois – of Tauranga. For services to the environment and Māori–Crown relations.
- Hoana Mere Burgman – of Kaiapoi. For services to Māori and environmental governance.
- Dr Heather Anne Came-Friar – of Auckland. For services to Māori, education and health.
- Malcolm James Campbell – of Kawerau. For services to local government and the community.
- Lloyd Russell Chapman – of Ōtaki. For services to the community and heritage rose preservation.
- David Christopher Chapple – of Palmerston North. For services to the community and heritage preservation.
- Brian Raymond Coffey – of Lower Hutt. For services to people with disabilities.
- Dr Gina Annette Cole – of Auckland. For services to literature.
- Catherine Mary Cornish – of Auckland. For services to the performing arts.
- Carlotta Brigid Dann – of Wellington. For services to addiction advocacy.
- Professor Christine Margaret Davies – of Auckland. For services to education.
- Dale Winifred Farrar – of Wellington. For services to the state.
- Father Paulo Sagato Filoialii – of Christchurch. For services to the Pacific community.
- Bruce James Ford JP – of Stewart Island / Rakiura. For services to the community.
- Ruth Beatrice Gerzon – of Whakatāne. For services to community development and social justice.
- Tony John Gray JP – of Nelson. For services to education.
- Albert Christopher Grinter – of Rotorua. For services to education and Māori.
- Phillip Ross Halse – of Whangārei. For services to local government and the community.
- Sefita 'Alofi Hao'uli – of Auckland. For services to Tongan and Pacific communities.
- Christina Angela Hape – of Hastings. For services to Māori and governance.
- Anna Maree Harrison – of Waimauku. For services to netball and volleyball.
- Ian Robert Archibald Hastie – of Upper Hutt. For services to education.
- Paul Leslie Hodge JP – of Hamilton. For services to the hospitality industry.
- John Maxwell Inger – of Morrinsville. For services to education.
- Dayle Olive Jackson – of Wellington. For services to education and sport.
- Penelope Jane Jackson – of Tauranga. For services to art crime research and visual arts.
- Mohamed Abdi Jama – of Christchurch. For services to the Muslim community.
- Tina Maria Jones – of Whangaparāoa. For services to suicide prevention and mental health.
- Lakiloko Tepae Keakea – of Auckland. For services to Tuvaluan art.
- Marilyn Rhonda Kohlhase – of Auckland. For services to Pacific arts and education.
- Debra Joy Lampshire – of Auckland. For services to mental health.
- Dr Alana Marissa Lopesi – of Eugene, Oregon. For services to the arts.
- Stanislaw Manterys – of Lower Hutt. For services to refugees and the Polish community.
- Dr Paul Allan Maunder – of Blackball. For services to the arts and the community.
- Felorini Ruta McKenzie – of Lincoln. For services to Pacific education.
- Richard Mark McNamara – of Blenheim. For services to Fire and Emergency New Zealand and emergency management.
- Senior Sergeant Clifford Gordon Metcalfe – of Whangārei. For services to the New Zealand Police and Search and Rescue.
- Betty-Anne Maryrose Monga – of Auckland. For services to music.
- Henriette Michel Nakhle QSM – of Auckland. For services to the Lebanese community.
- Melony Robin O'Connor – of Lower Hutt. For services to basketball.
- Jocelyn Jane O'Donnell – of Invercargill. For services to business and community development.
- Sullivan Luao Paea – of Manukau. For services to youth.
- Corey Nathan Peters – of Wānaka. For services to sit-skiing.
- Nico Porteous – of Wānaka. For services to snow sports.
- Russell John Postlewaight – of Porirua. For services to Fire and Emergency New Zealand.
- Rita Keka Powick – of Picton. For services to Māori, education and governance.
- Shirleen Vinita Lata Prasad – of Auckland. For services to addiction services and the South Asian community.
- Helen Ngairie Rasmussen – of Hokitika. For services to Māori and conservation.
- Rosanna Marie Raymond – of Auckland. For services to Pacific art.
- Bonnie Jane Robinson – of Auckland. For services to seniors and social services.
- Christopher Stephen Rooney – of Auckland. For services to education.
- Reweti Ratu Ropiha – of Gisborne. For services to Māori health.
- Zoi Katherine Sadowski-Synnott – of Wānaka. For services to snow sports.
- Jennifer Robyn Shattock QSM JP – of Tokoroa. For services to local government and economic development.
- Sarah (Sally) Margaret Shaw – of Whakatāne. For services to nursing.
- Dr Gregory Howard Sherley – of Paraparaumu. For services to conservation.
- Dr Jane Elizabeth Skeen – of Auckland. For services to children with cancer.
- Cheryl Smith – of Kaikohe. For services to rugby.
- Margaret Teresa Tai Rākena – of Christchurch. For services to victims of sexual violence and the community.
- John Maxwell Tait – of Christchurch. For services to education and Māori.
- Dr Amama Bagem Thornley – of Christchurch. For services to health.
- Charles Beswick Wilkinson – of New Plymouth. For services to arts governance and the community.
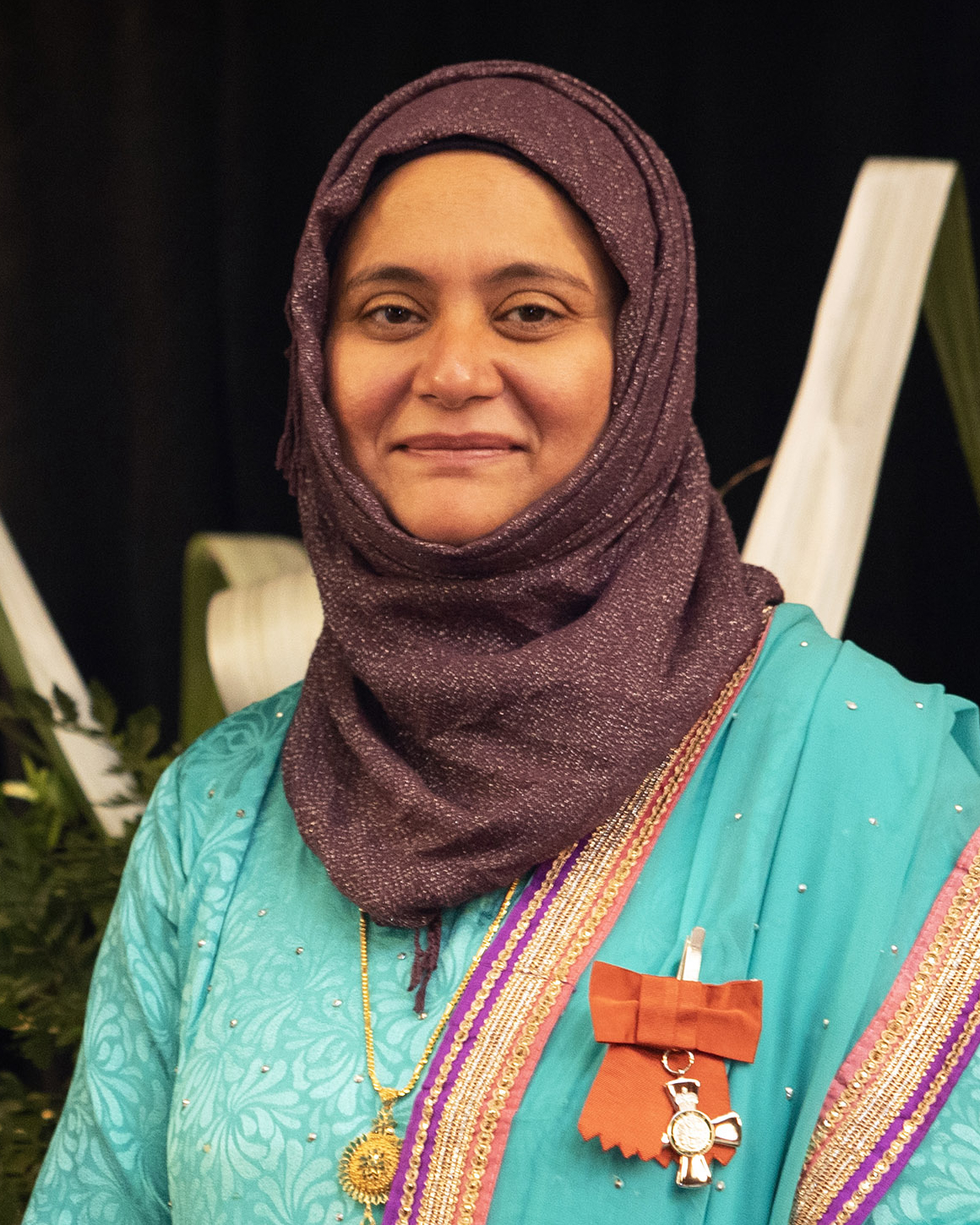
Hafsa Ahmed

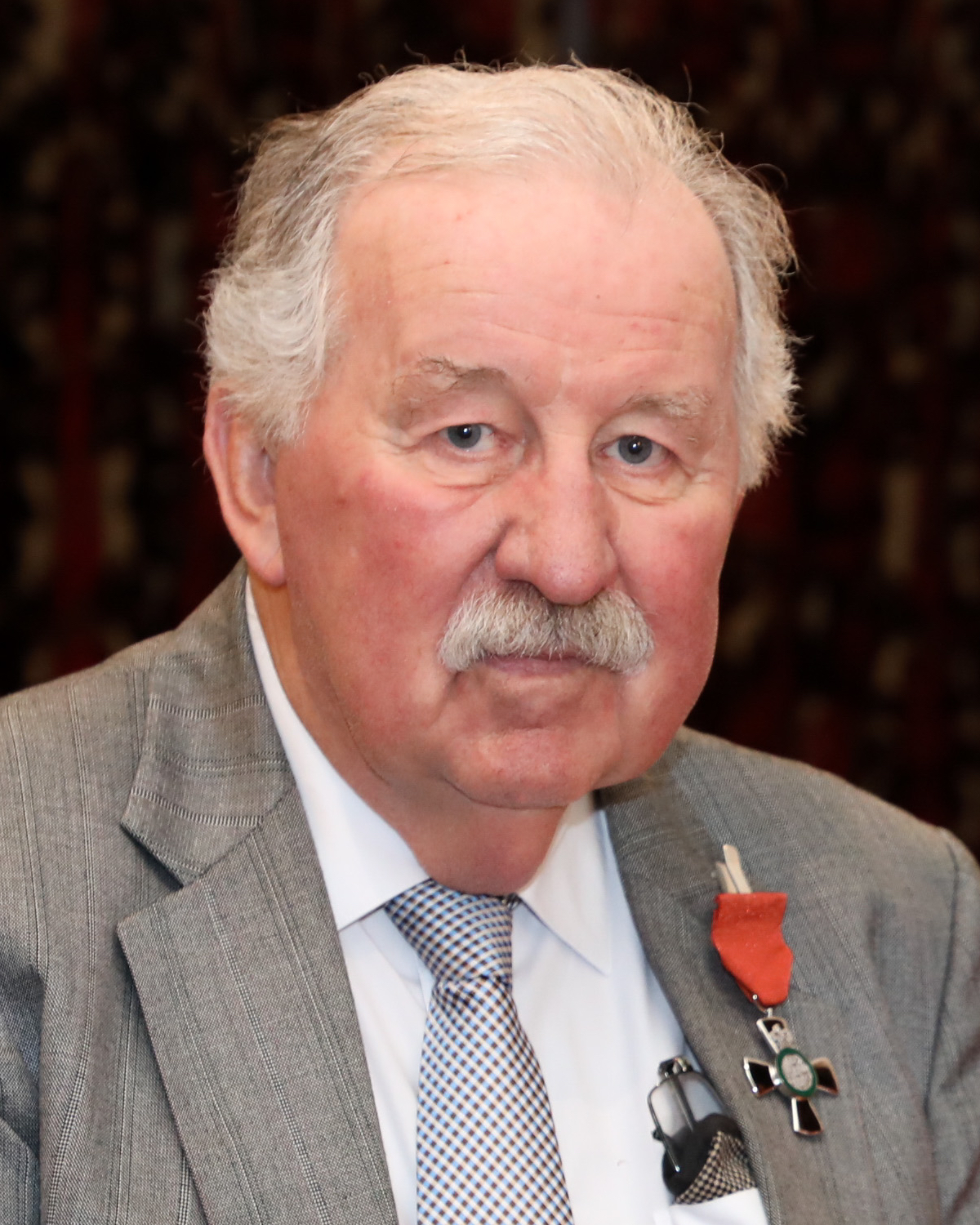
Wallace Bain

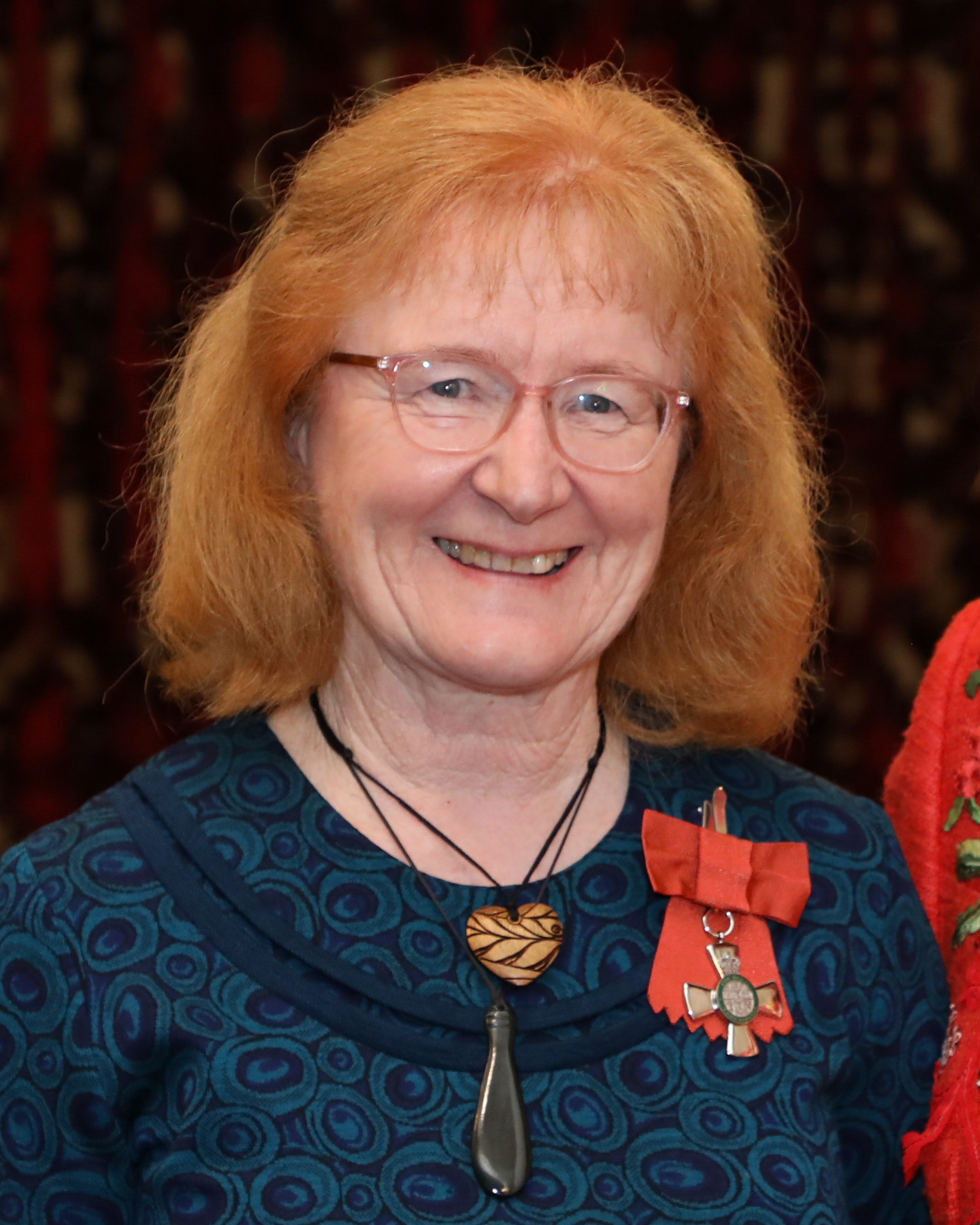
Priscilla Baken

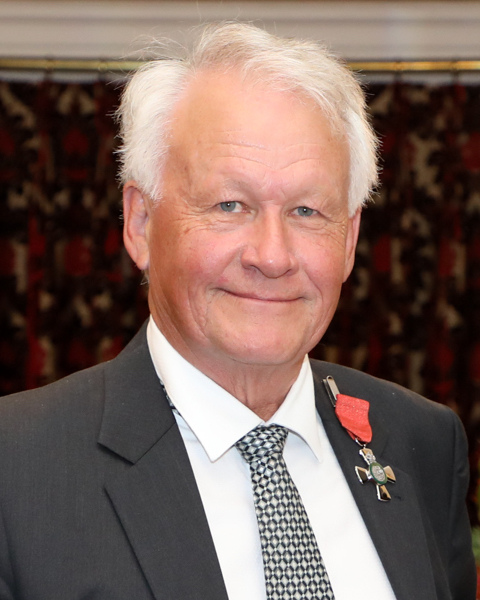
Tim Bevin

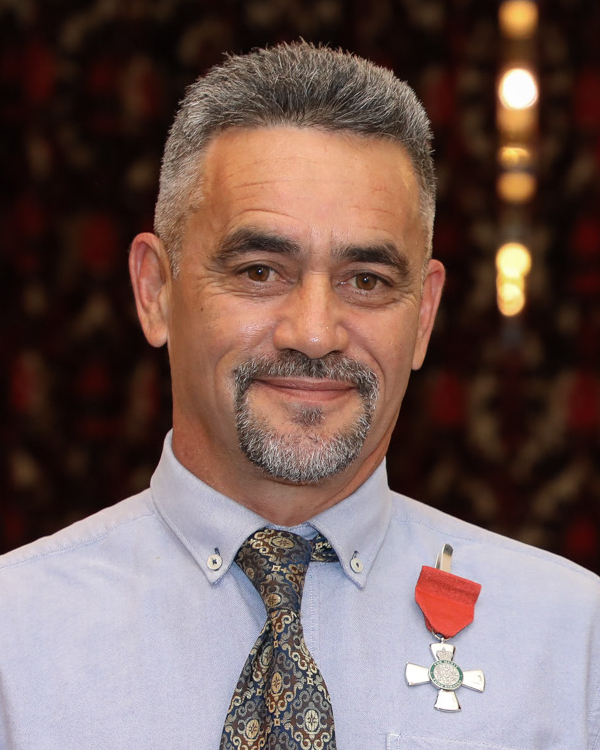
Carlton Bidois

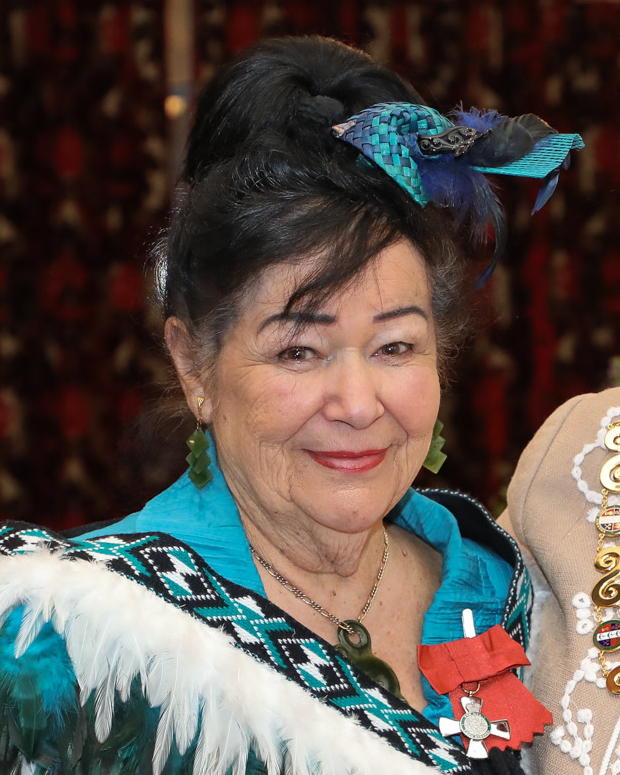
Hoana Burgman

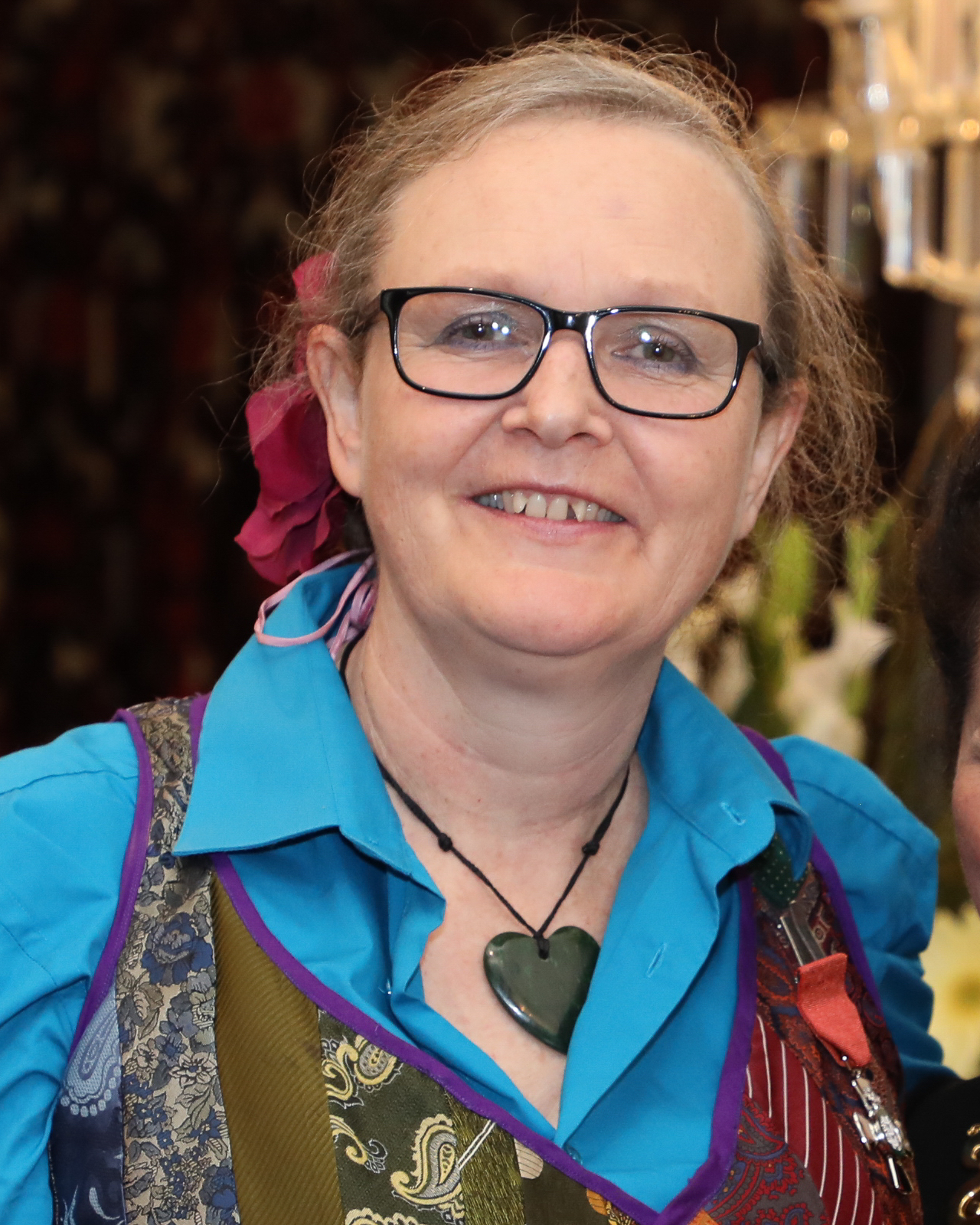
Heather Came-Friar

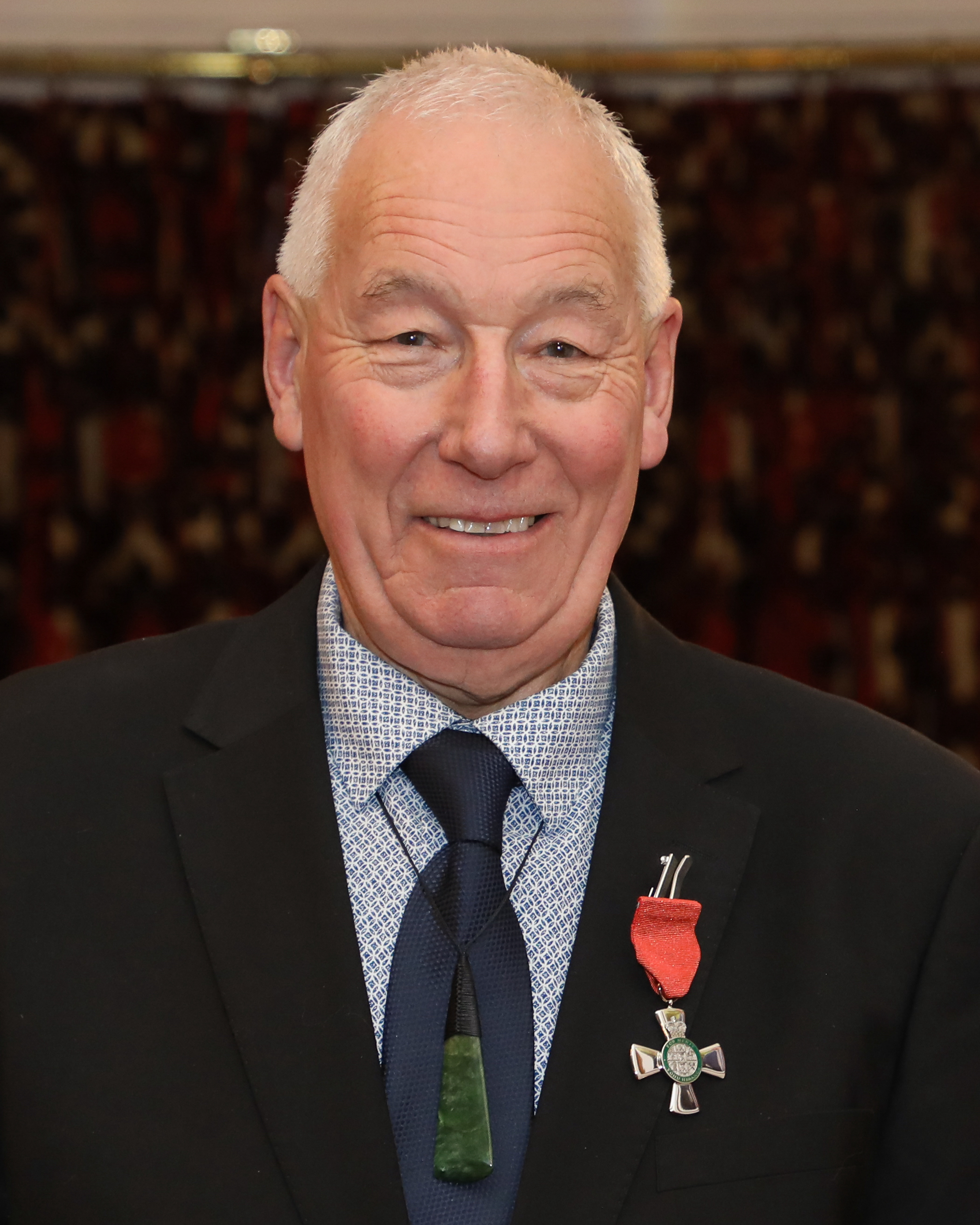
Malcolm Campbell

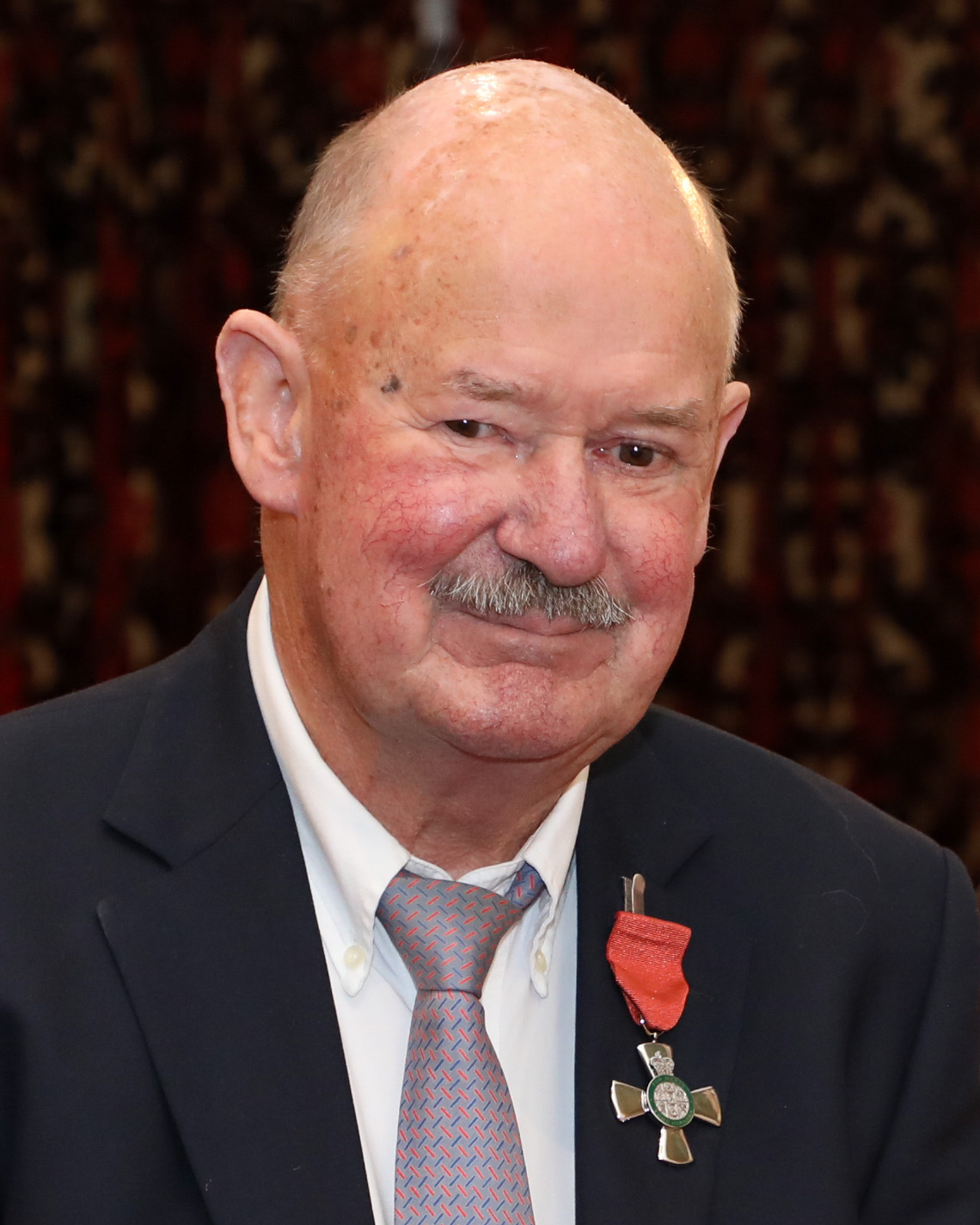
Lloyd Chapman

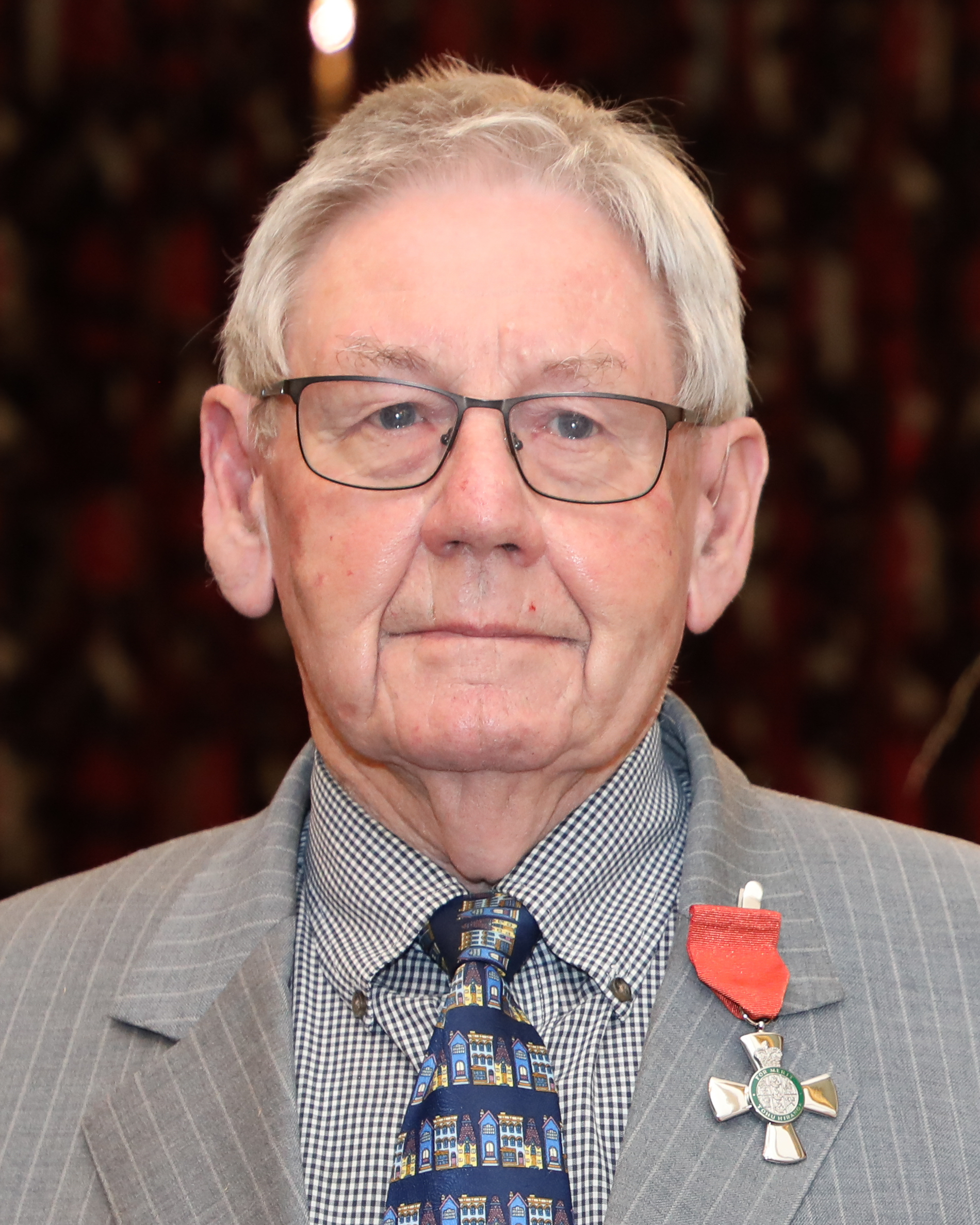
David Chapple

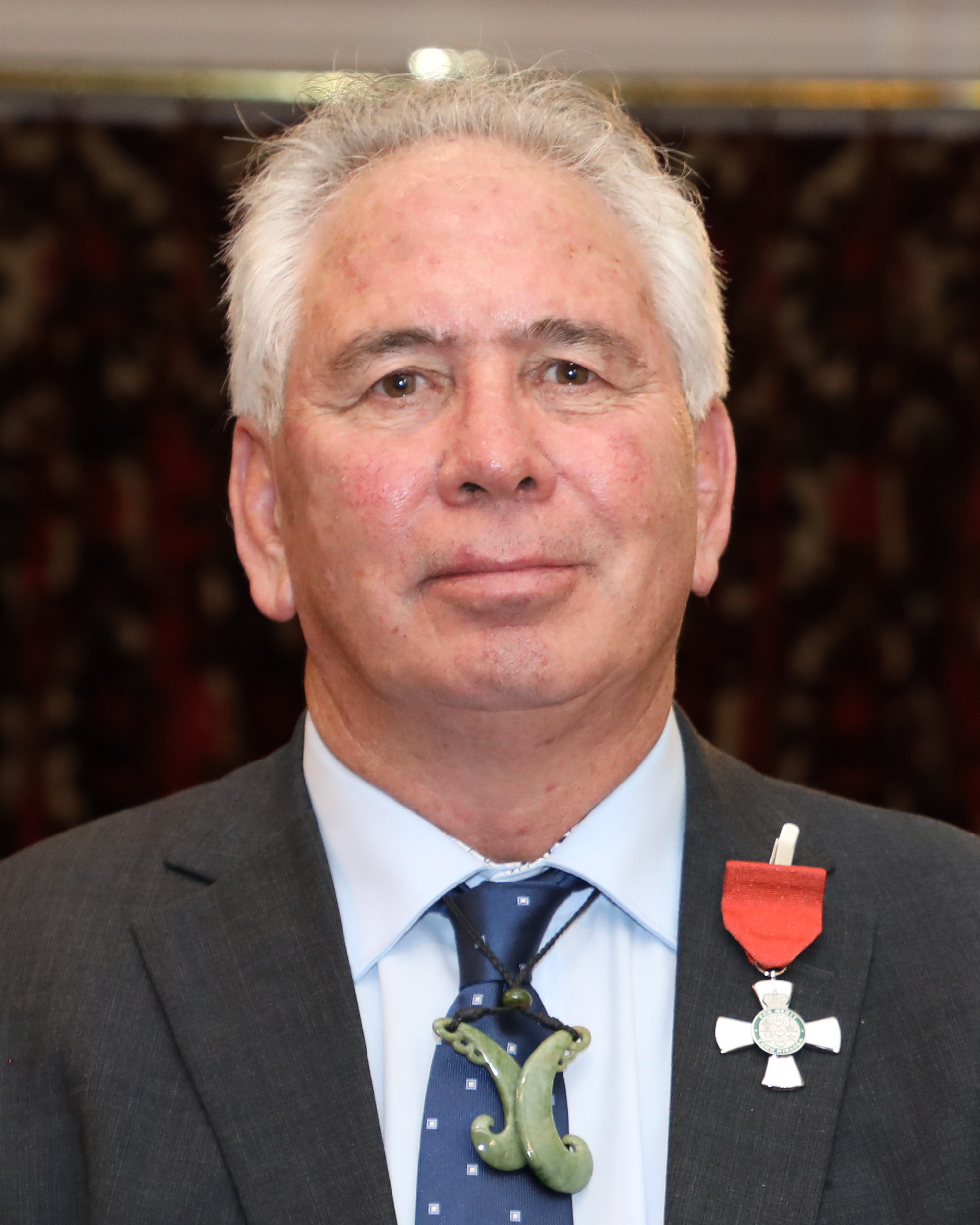
Brian Coffey

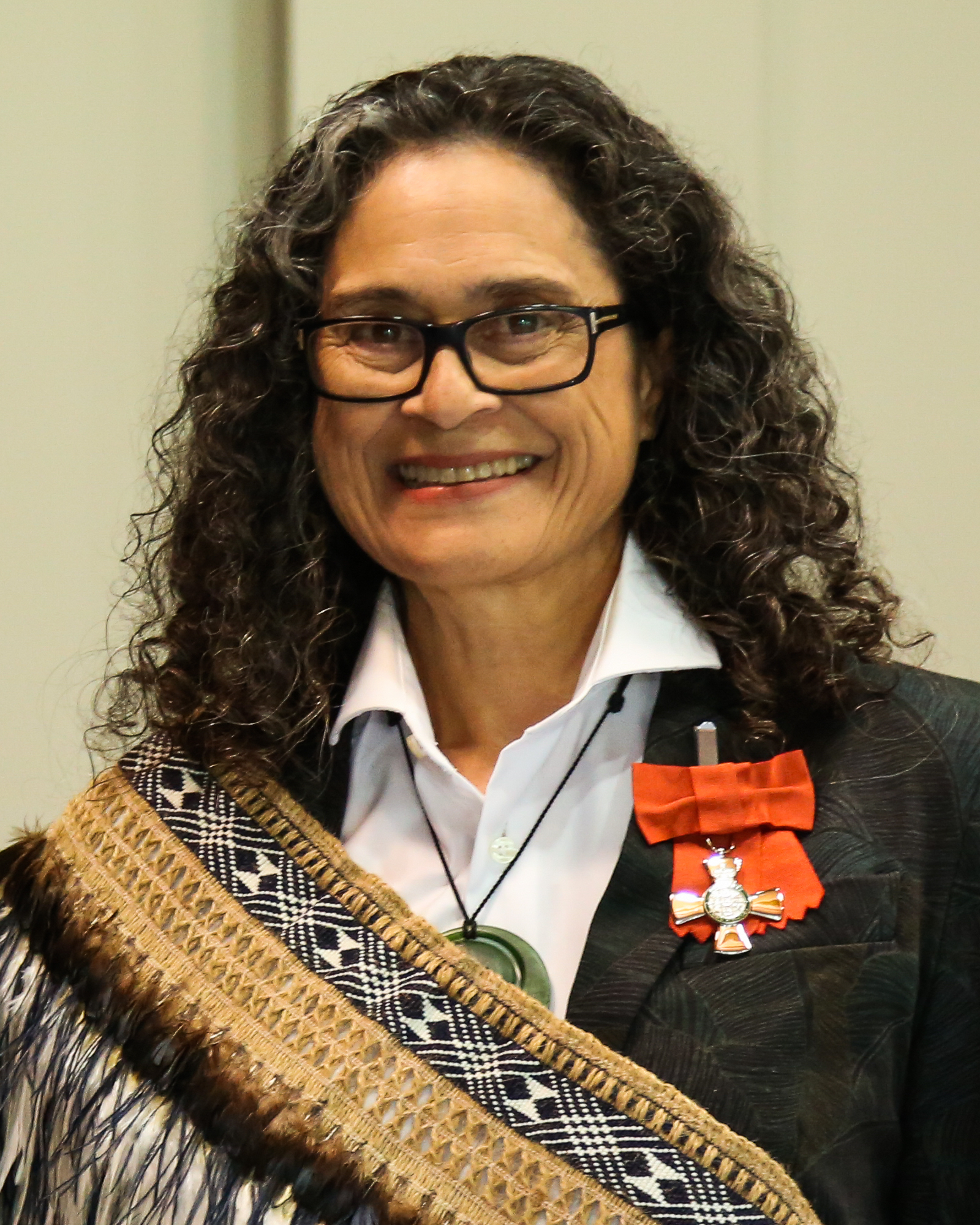
Gina Cole

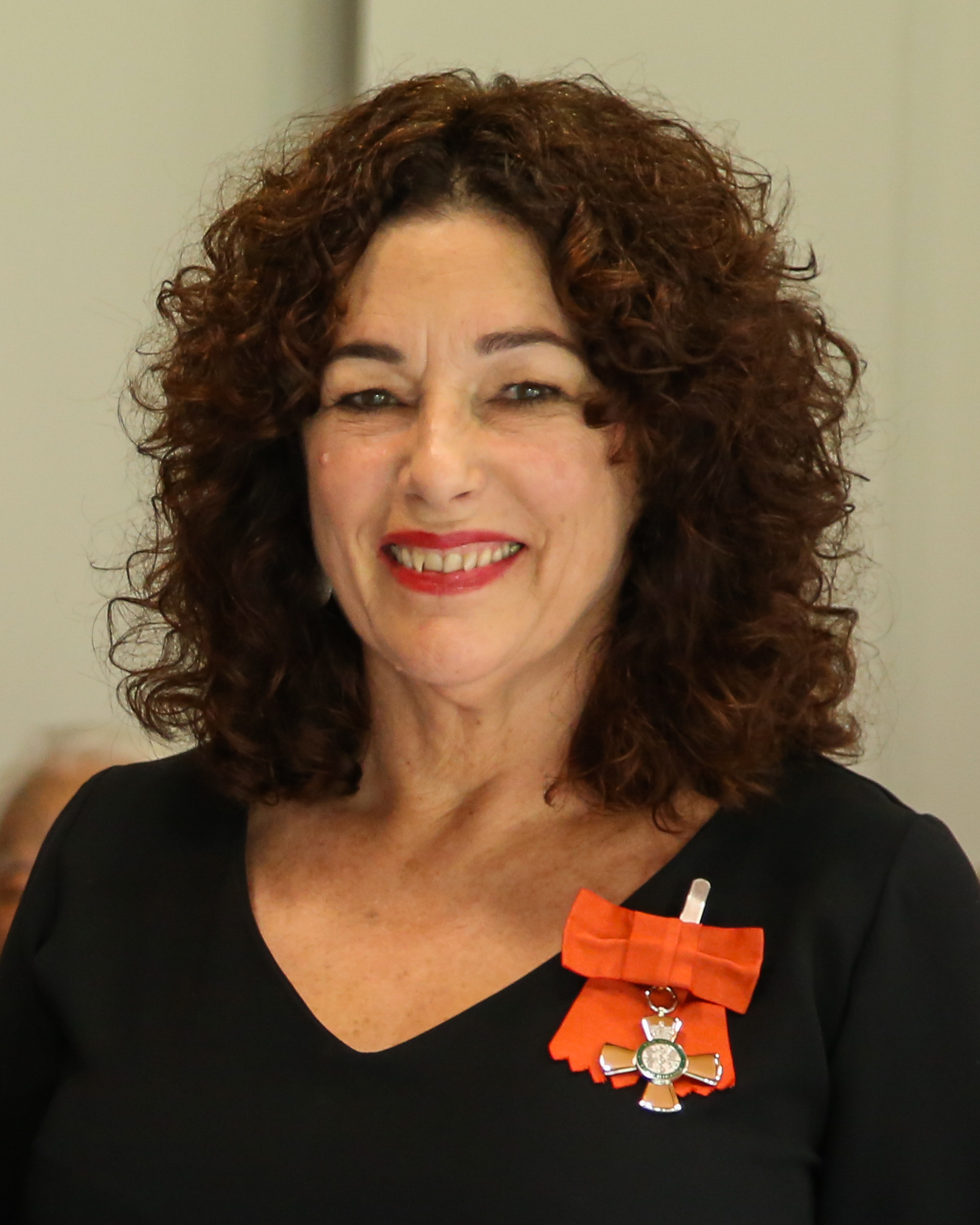
Mary Cornish

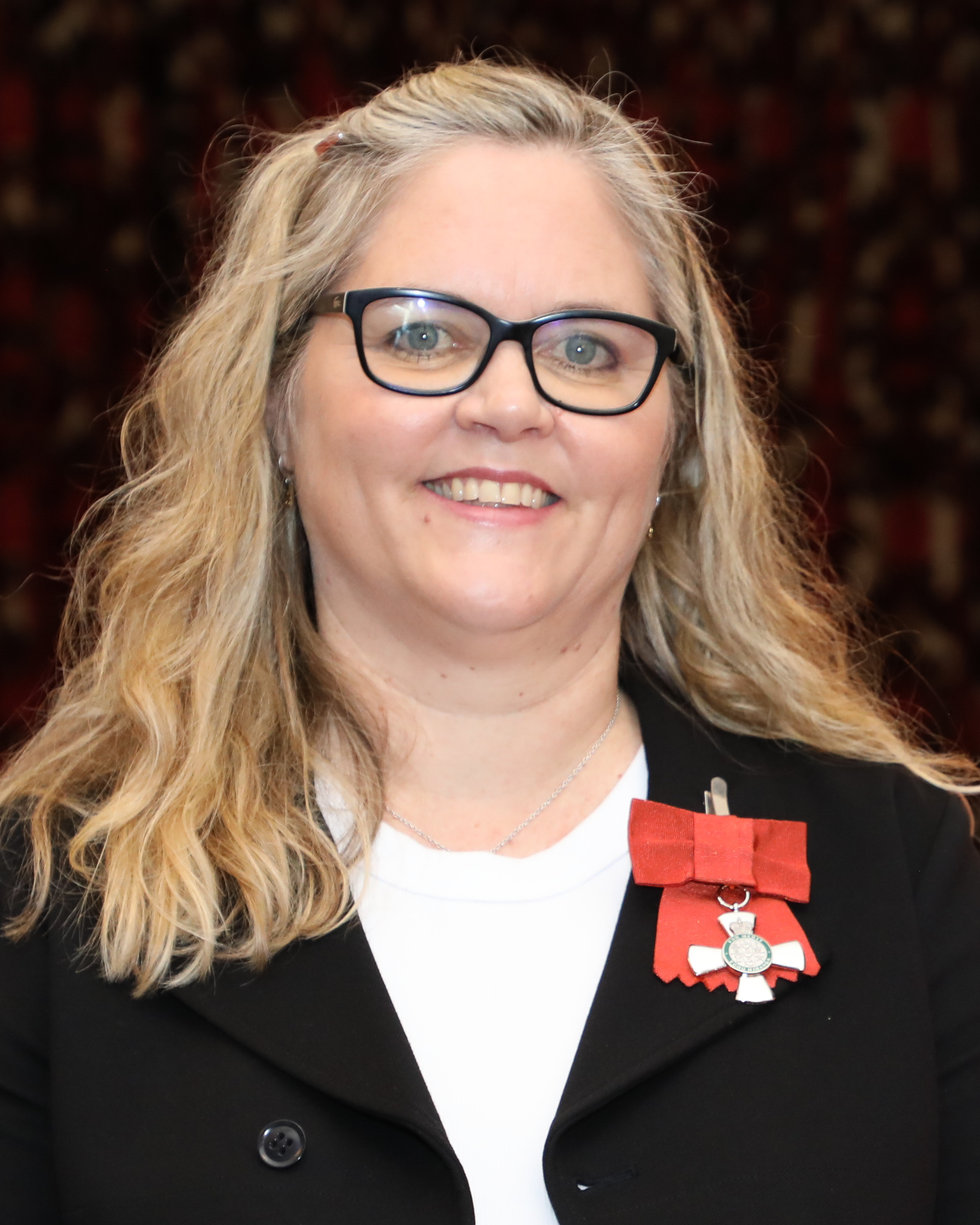
Lotta Dann

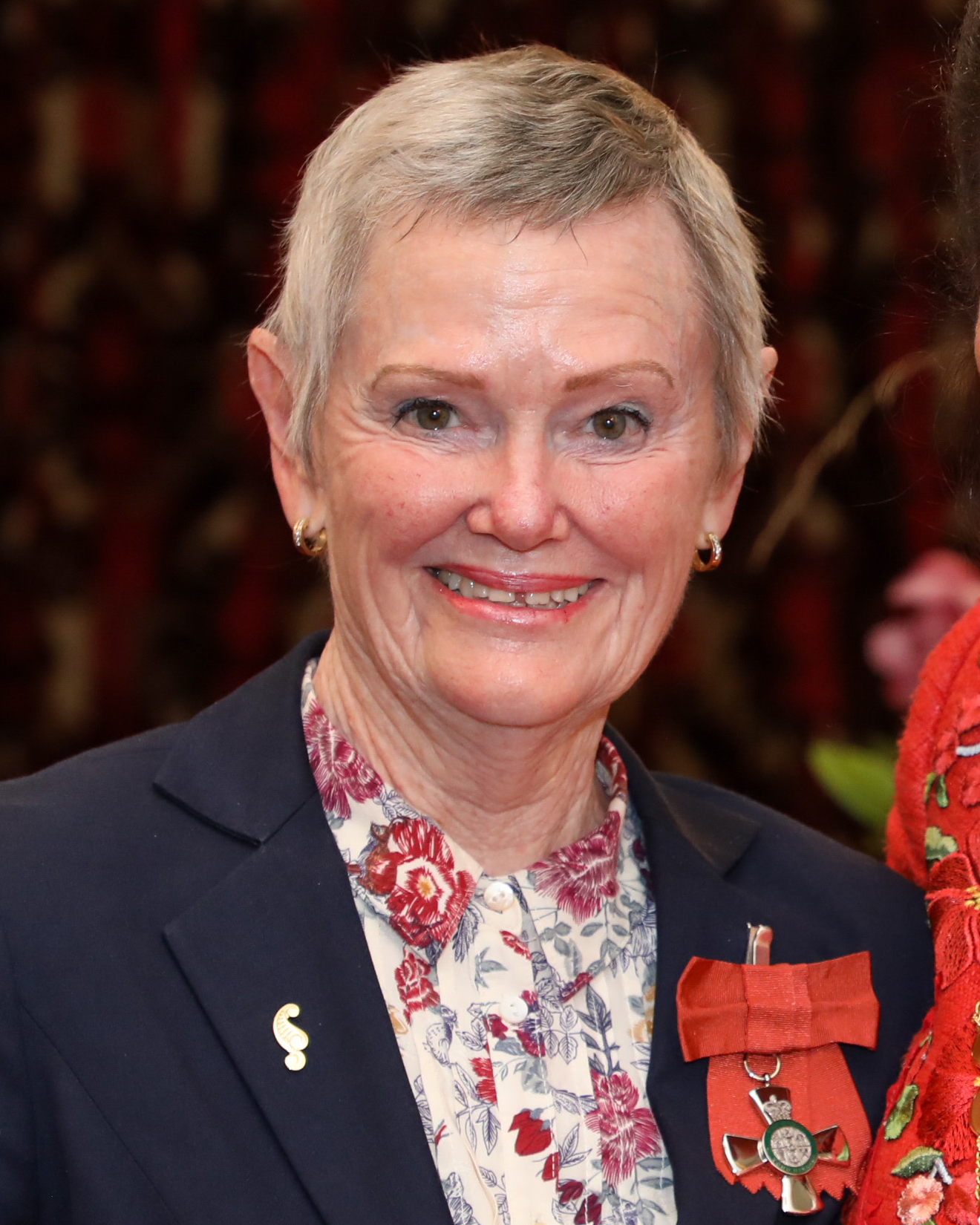
Christine Rubie-Davies

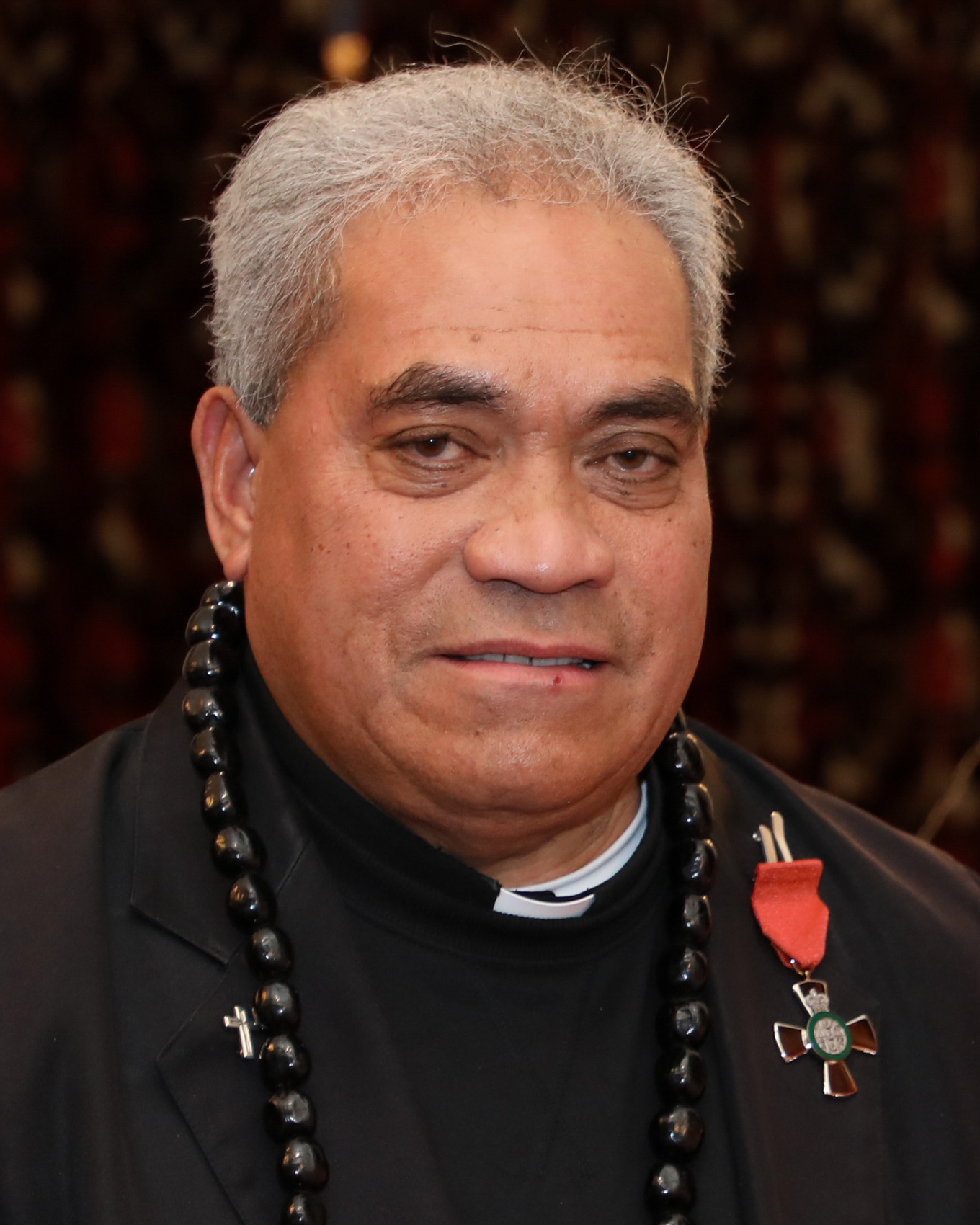
Paulo Filoialii

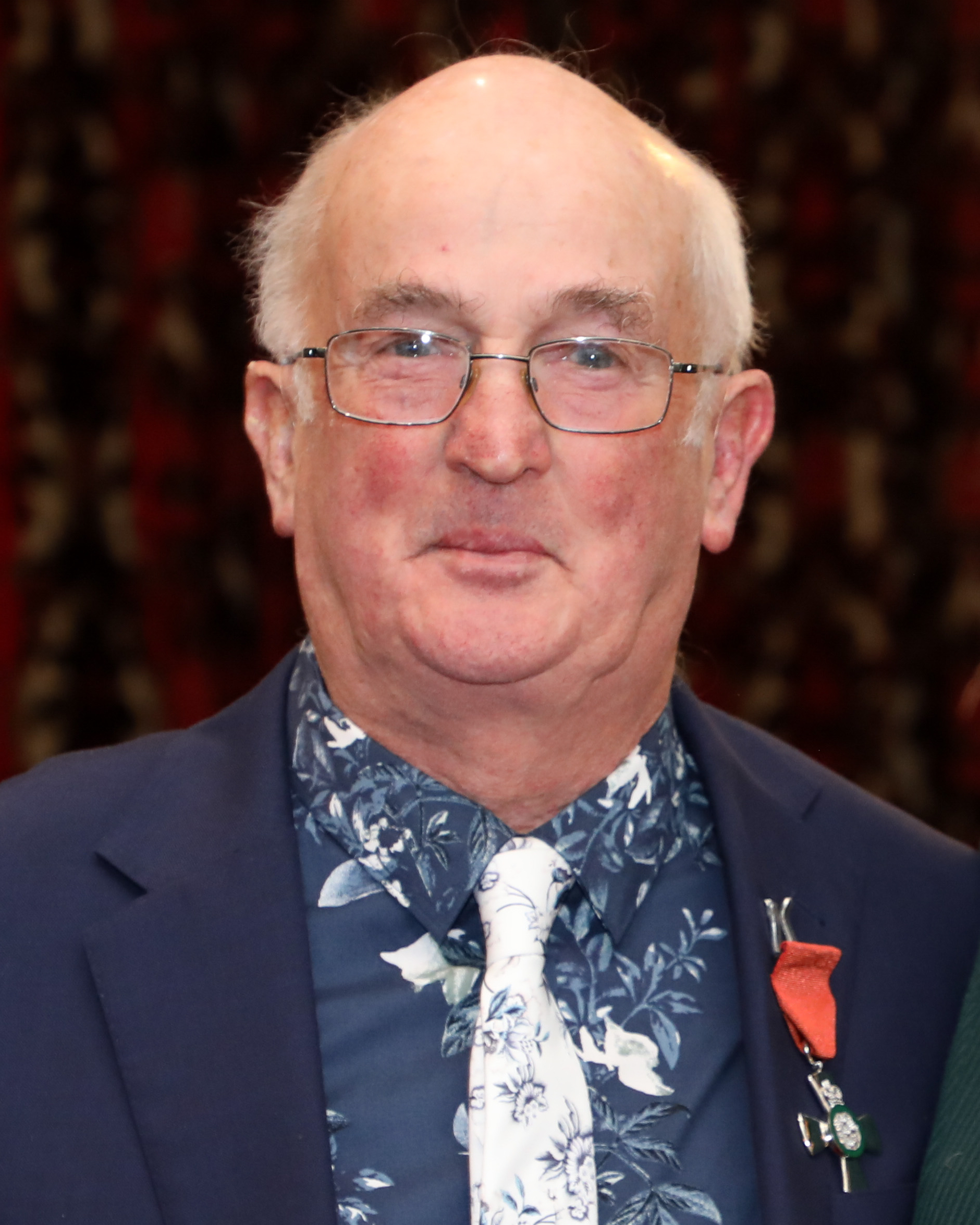
Bruce Ford

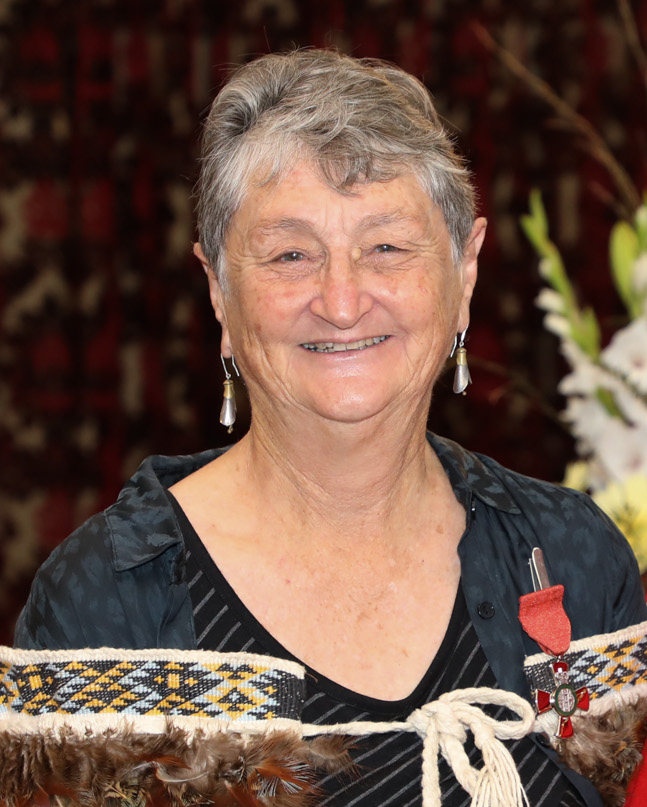
Ruth Gerzon

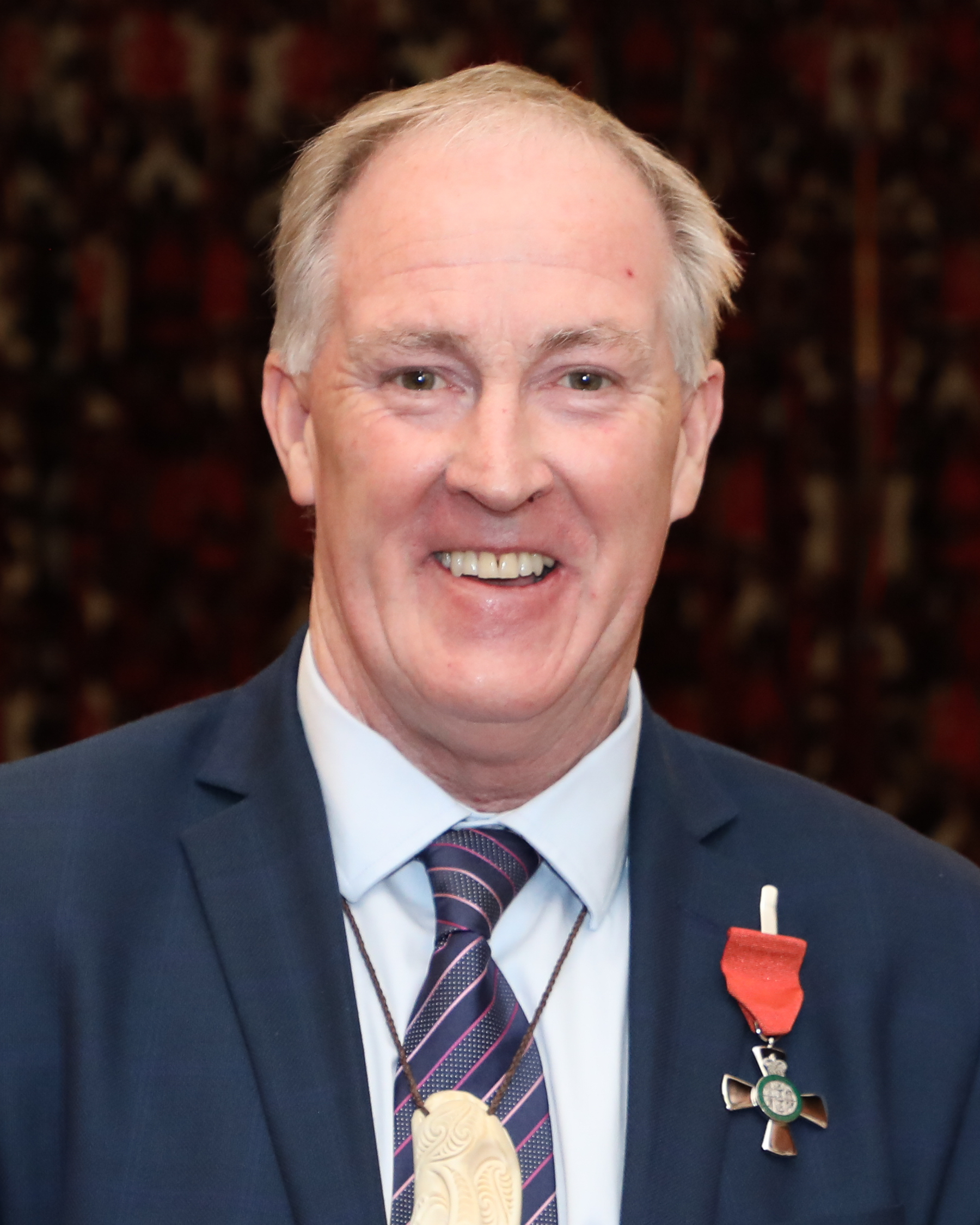
Tony Gray

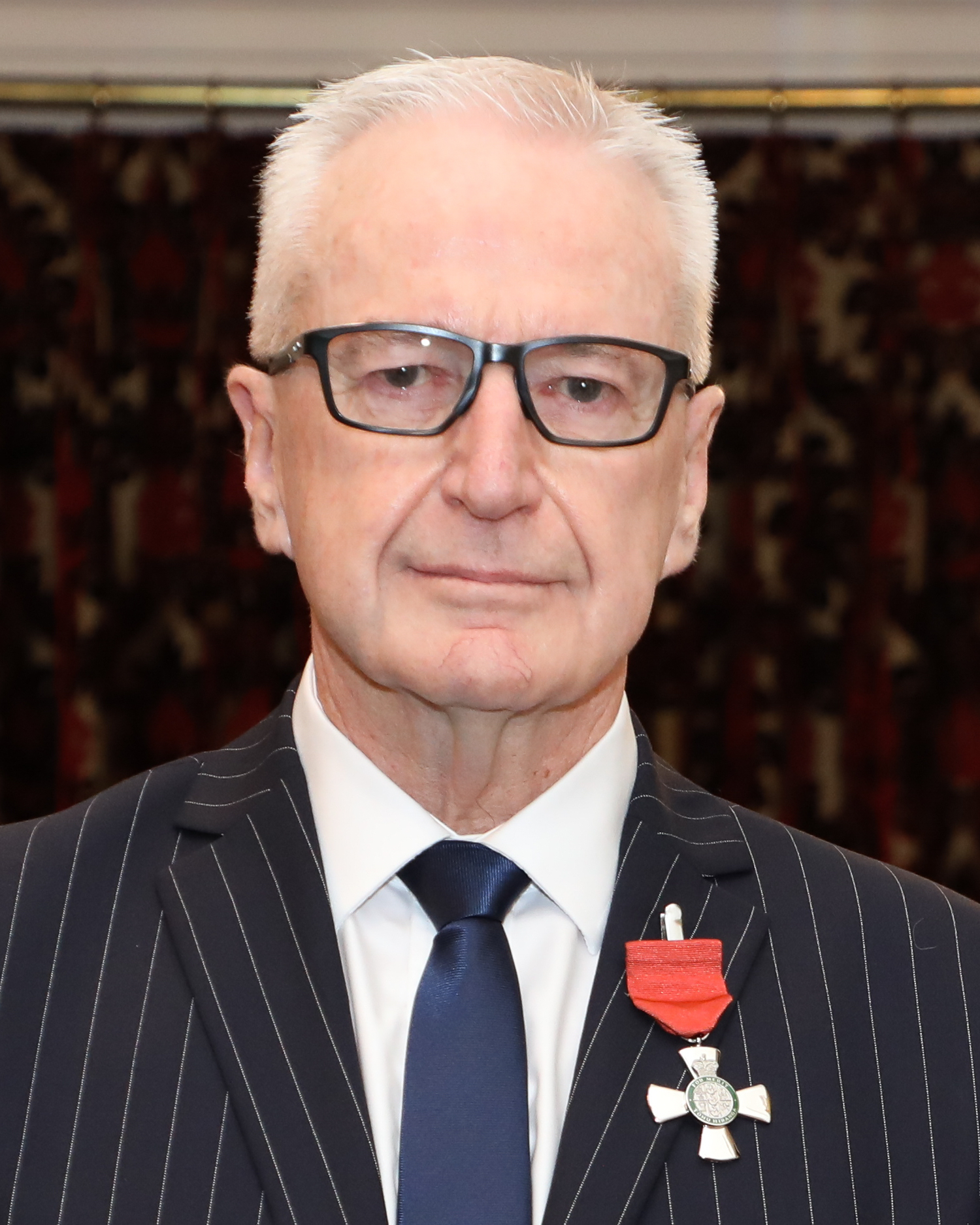
Chris Grinter

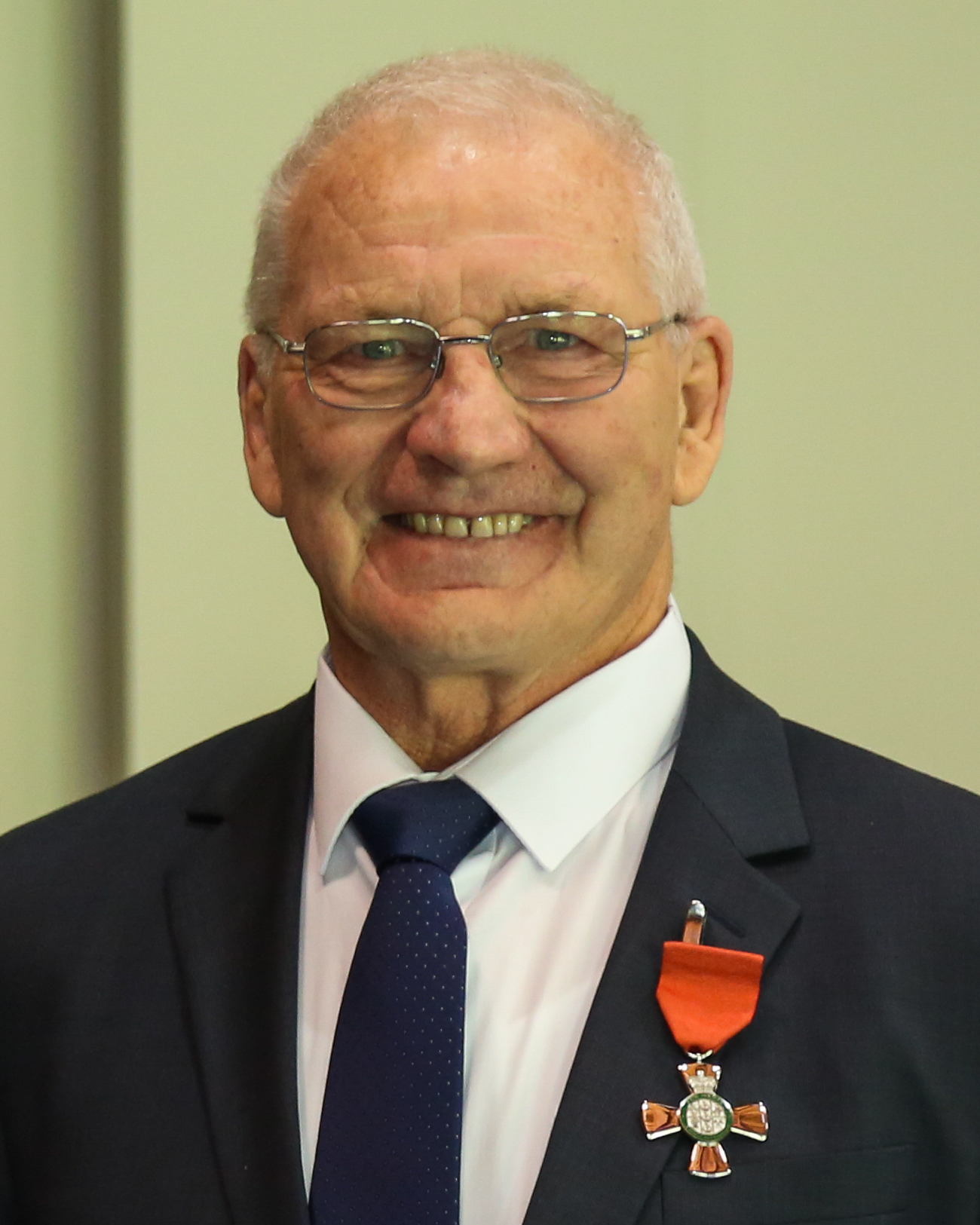
Phil Halse

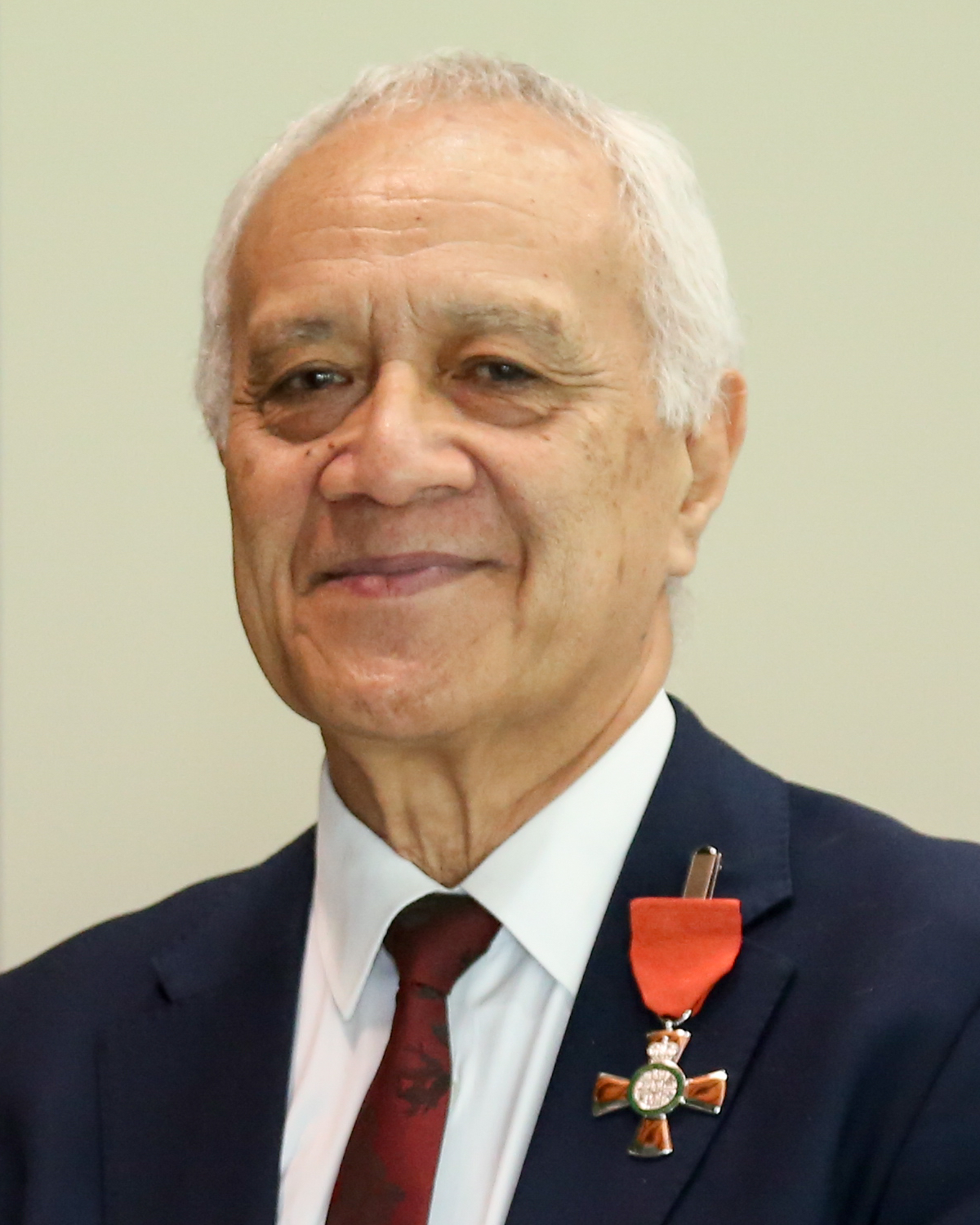
Sefita Hao'uli

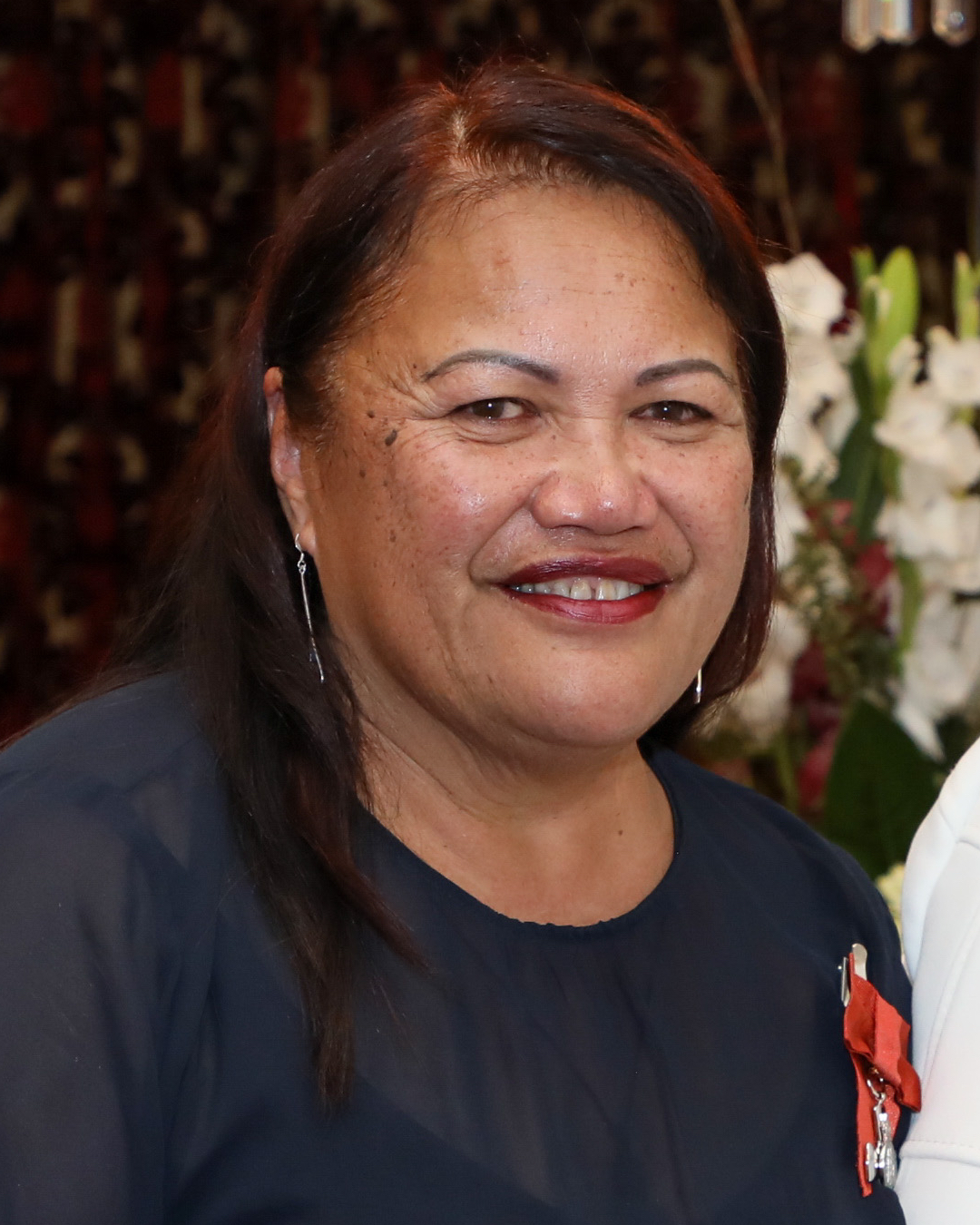
Chrissie Hape

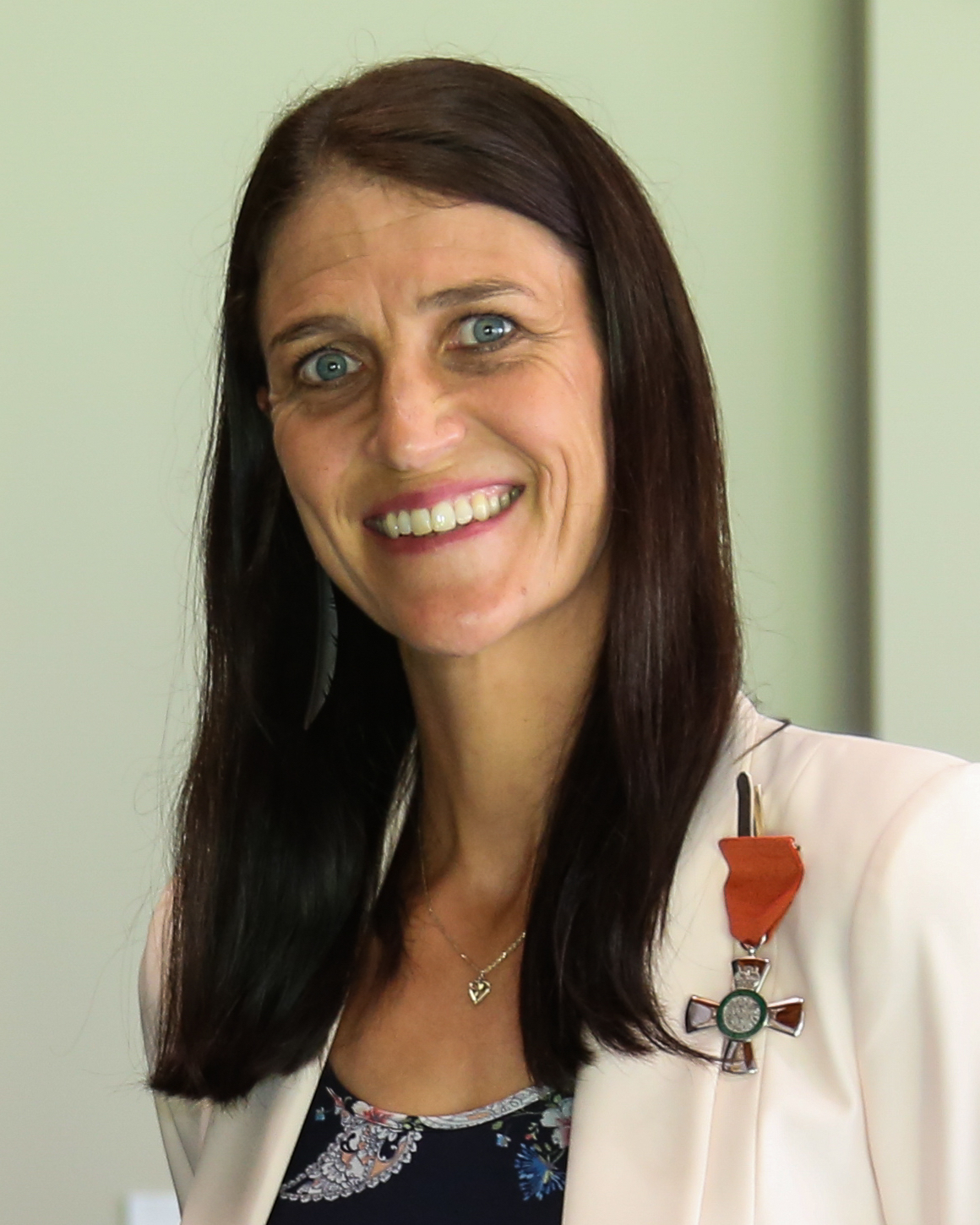
Anna Harrison

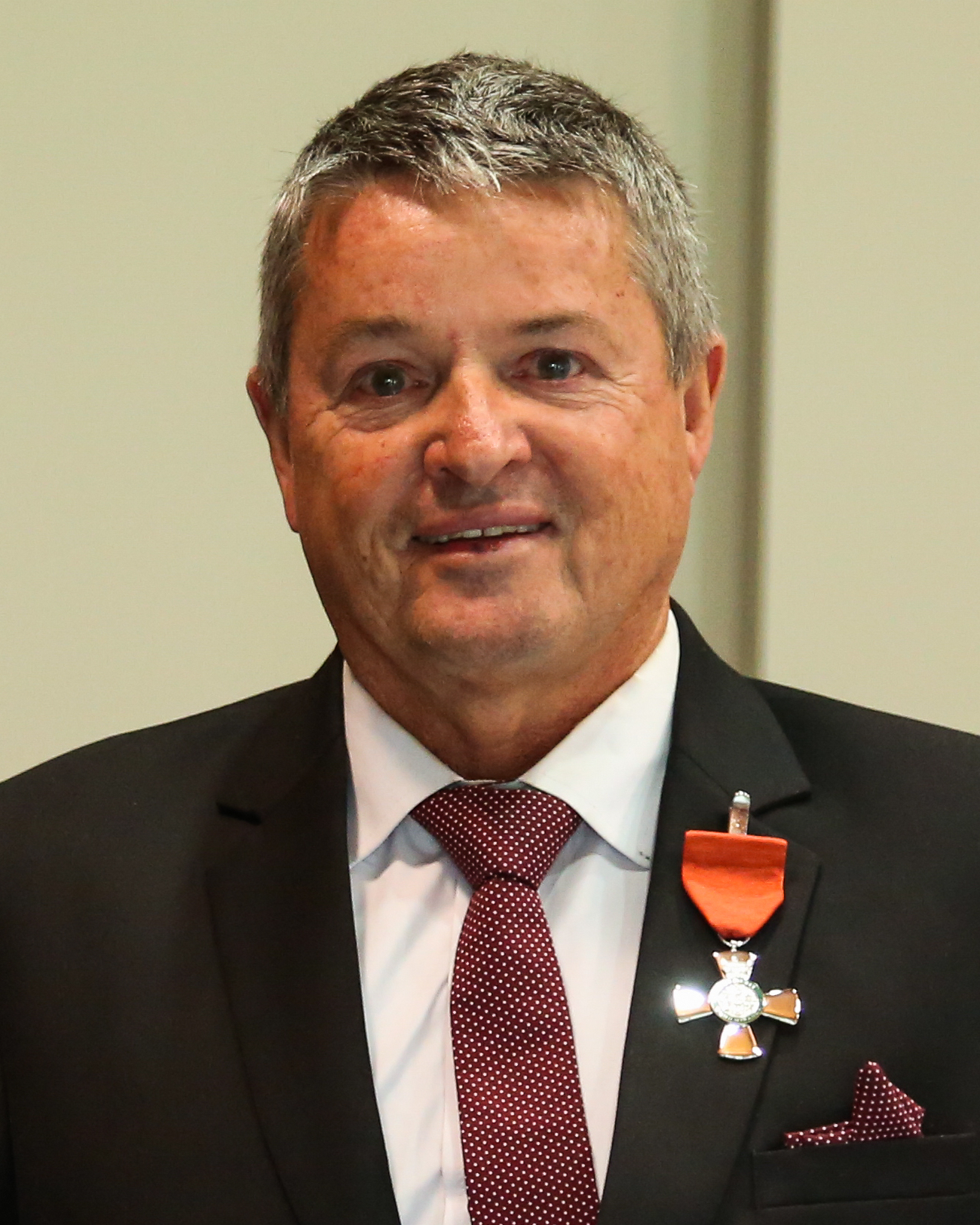
Paul Hodge

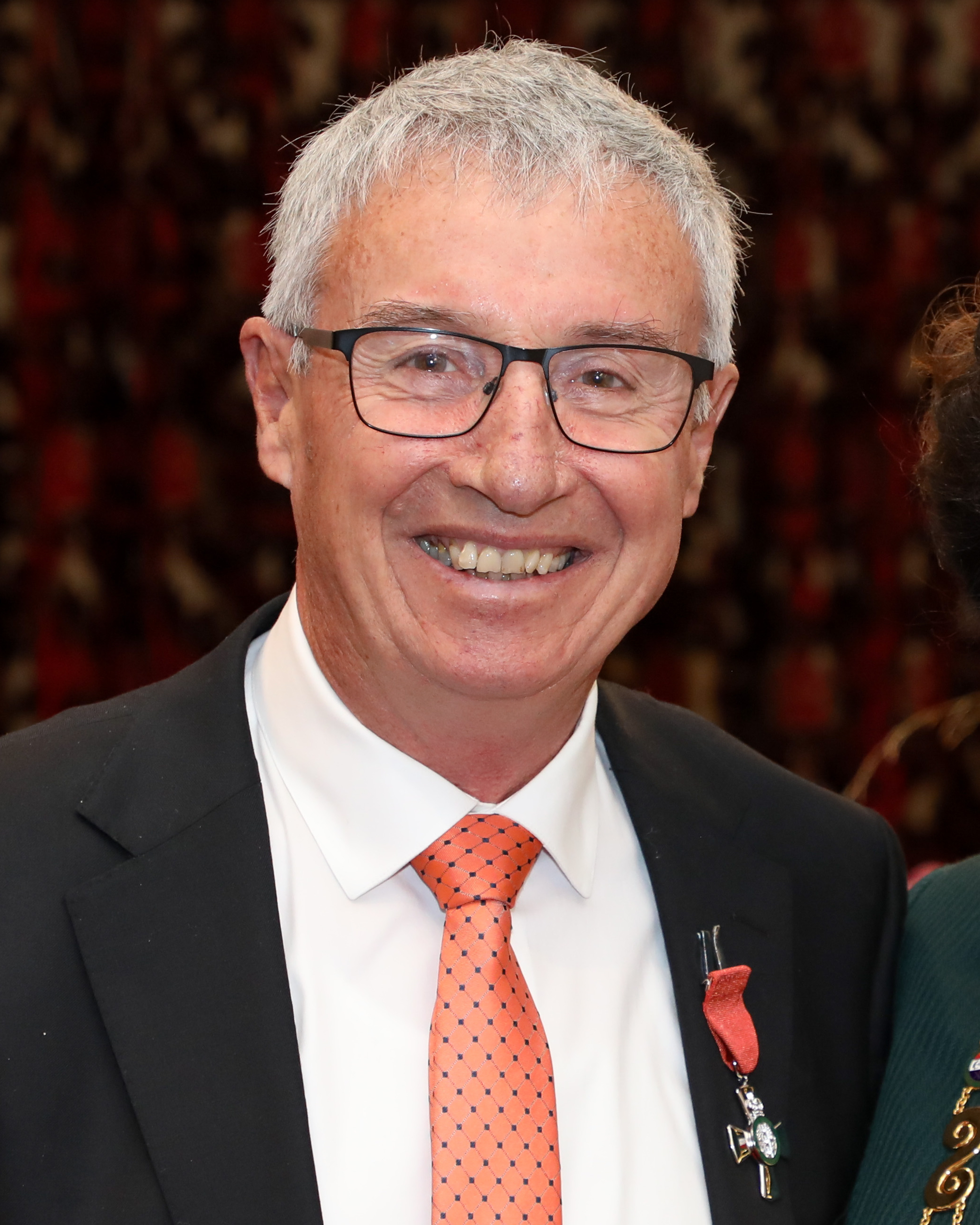
John Inger

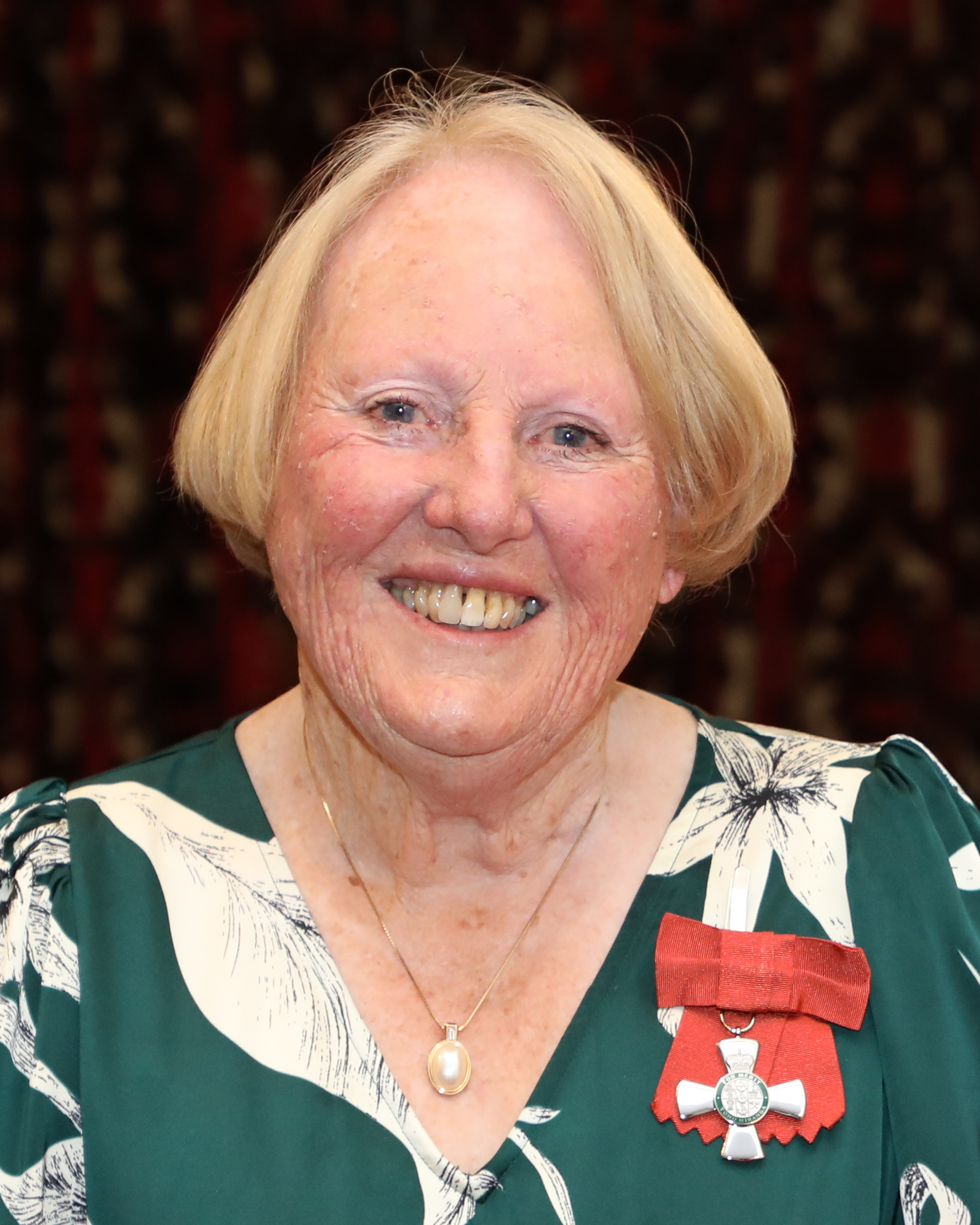
Dayle Jackson

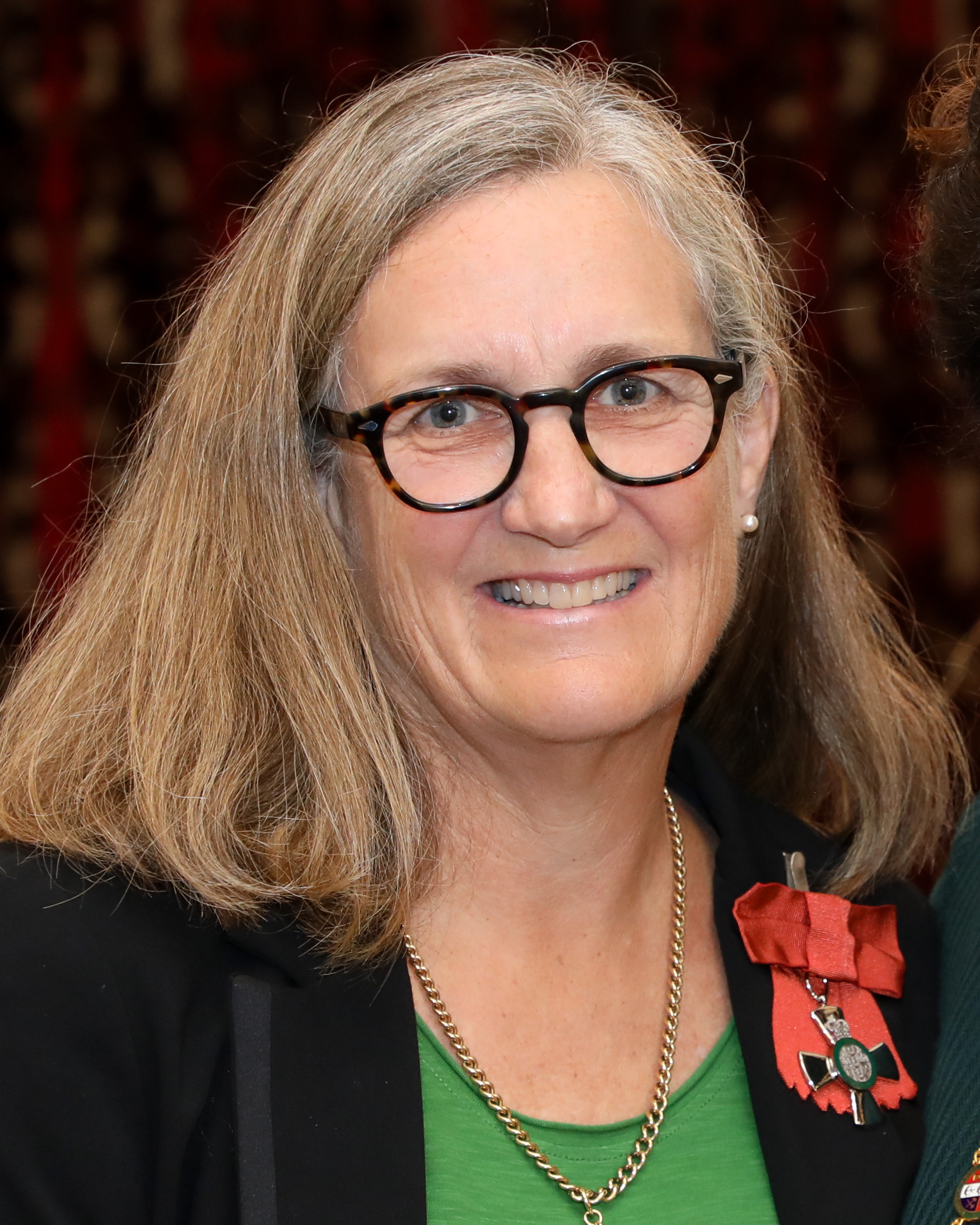
Penelope Jackson

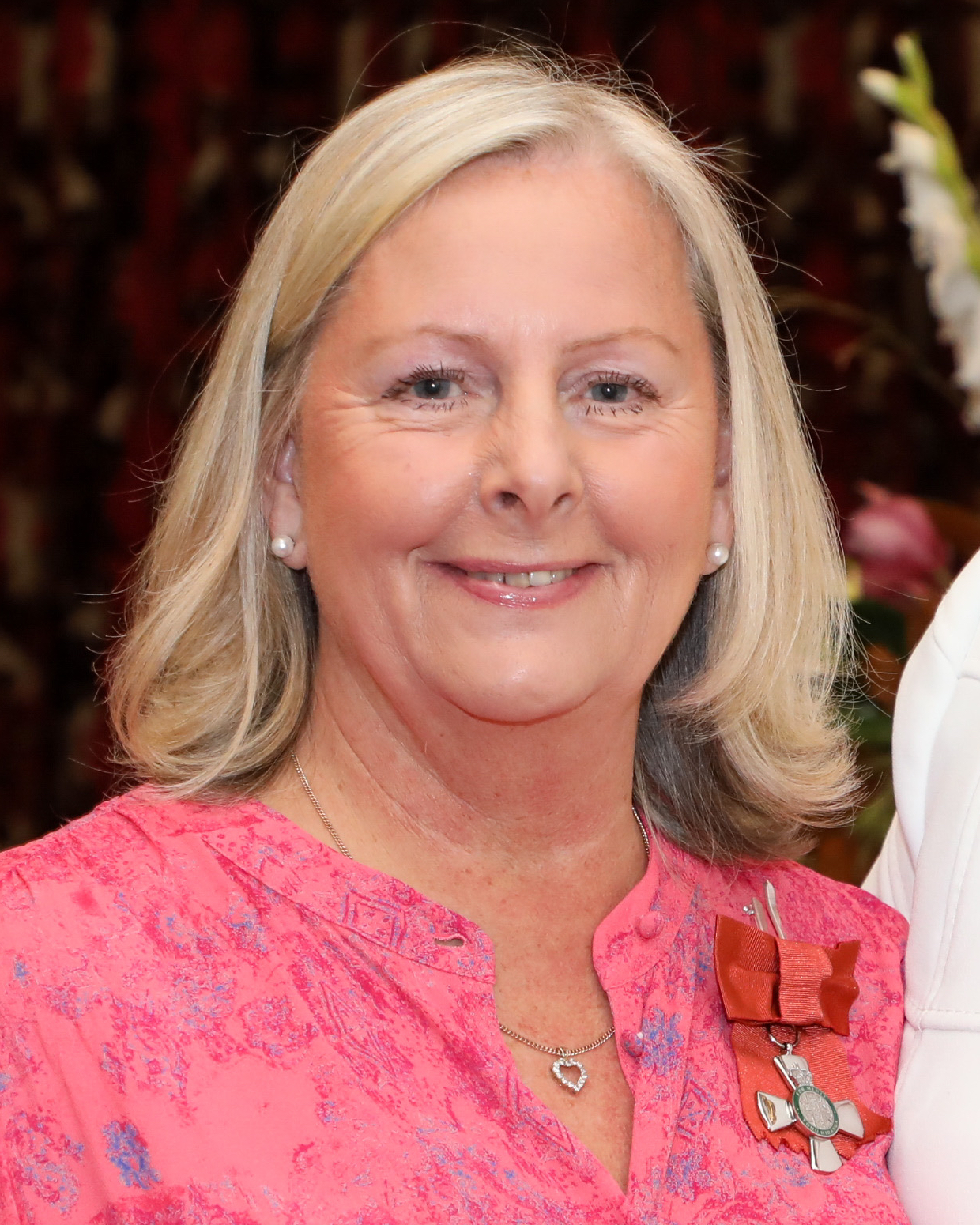
Tina Jones

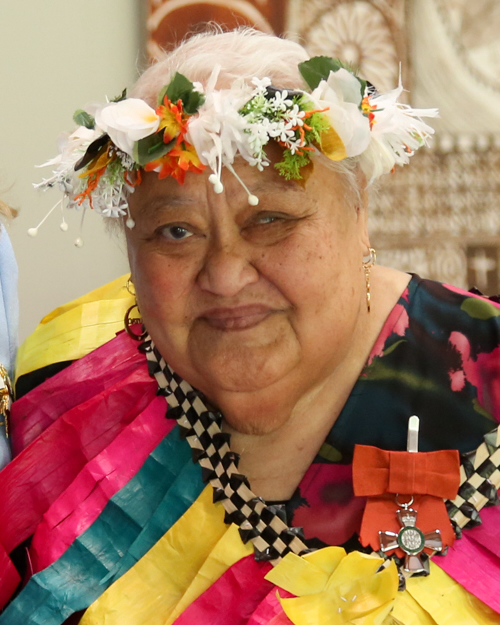
Lakiloko Keakea

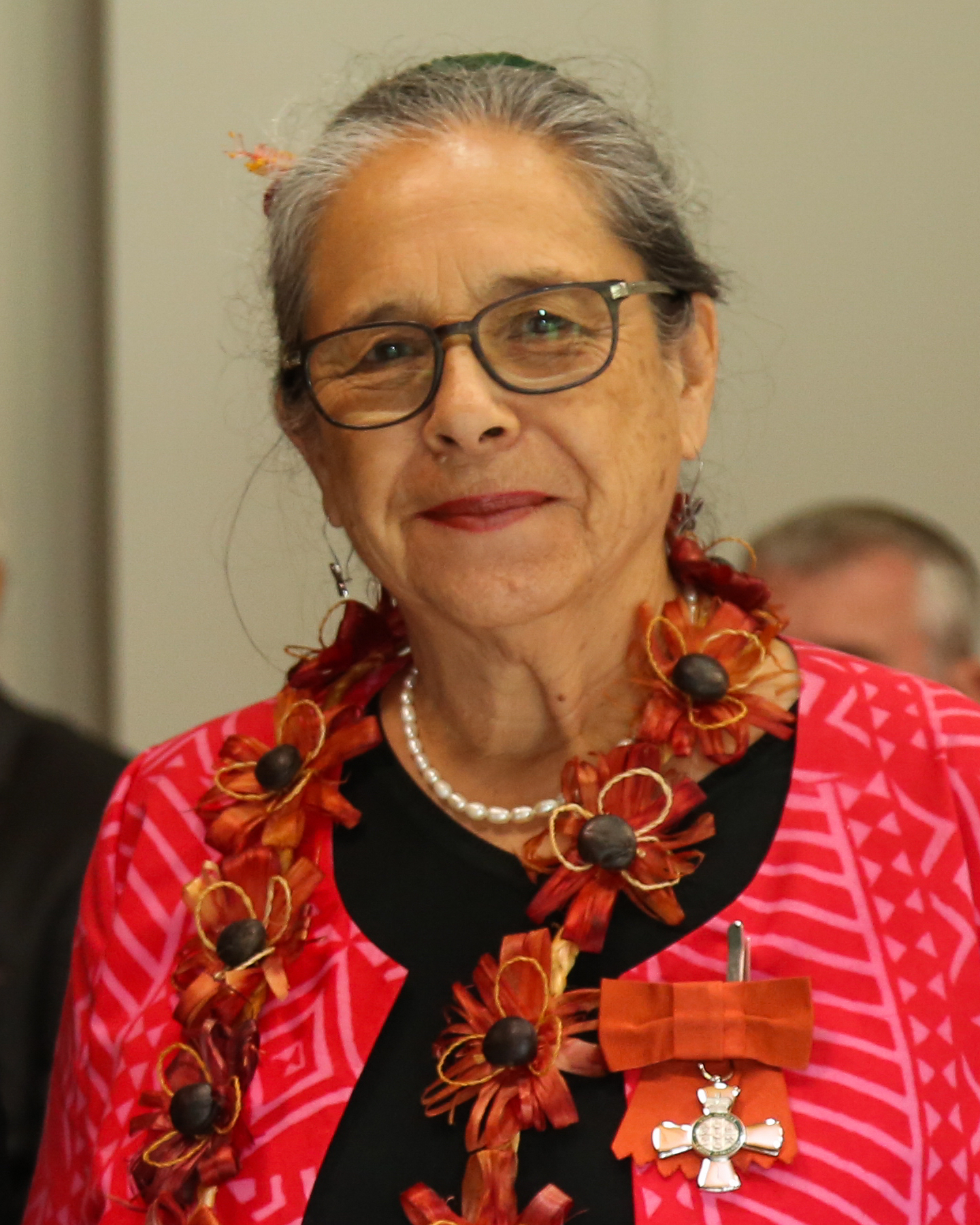
Marilyn Kohlhase

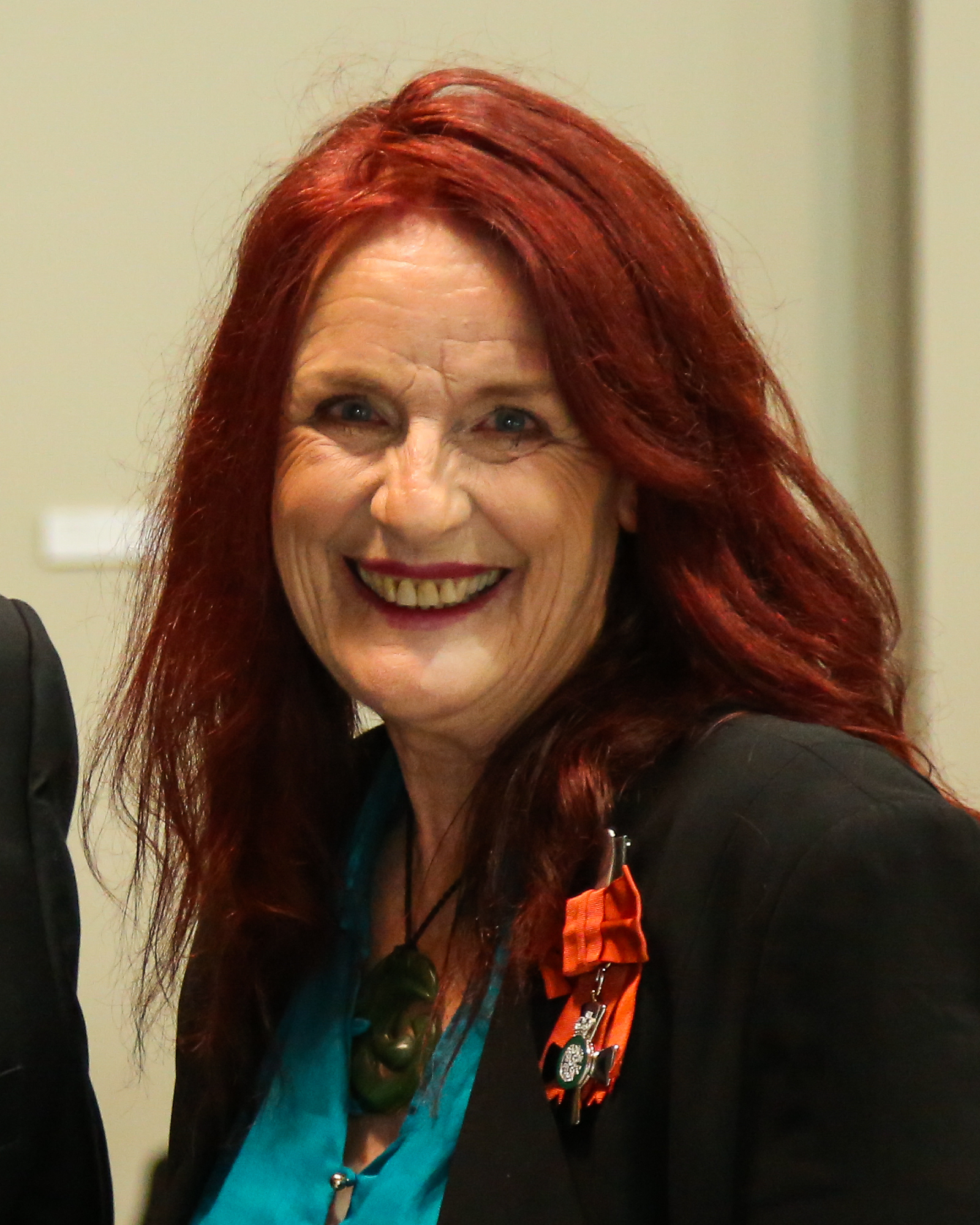
Debra Lampshire

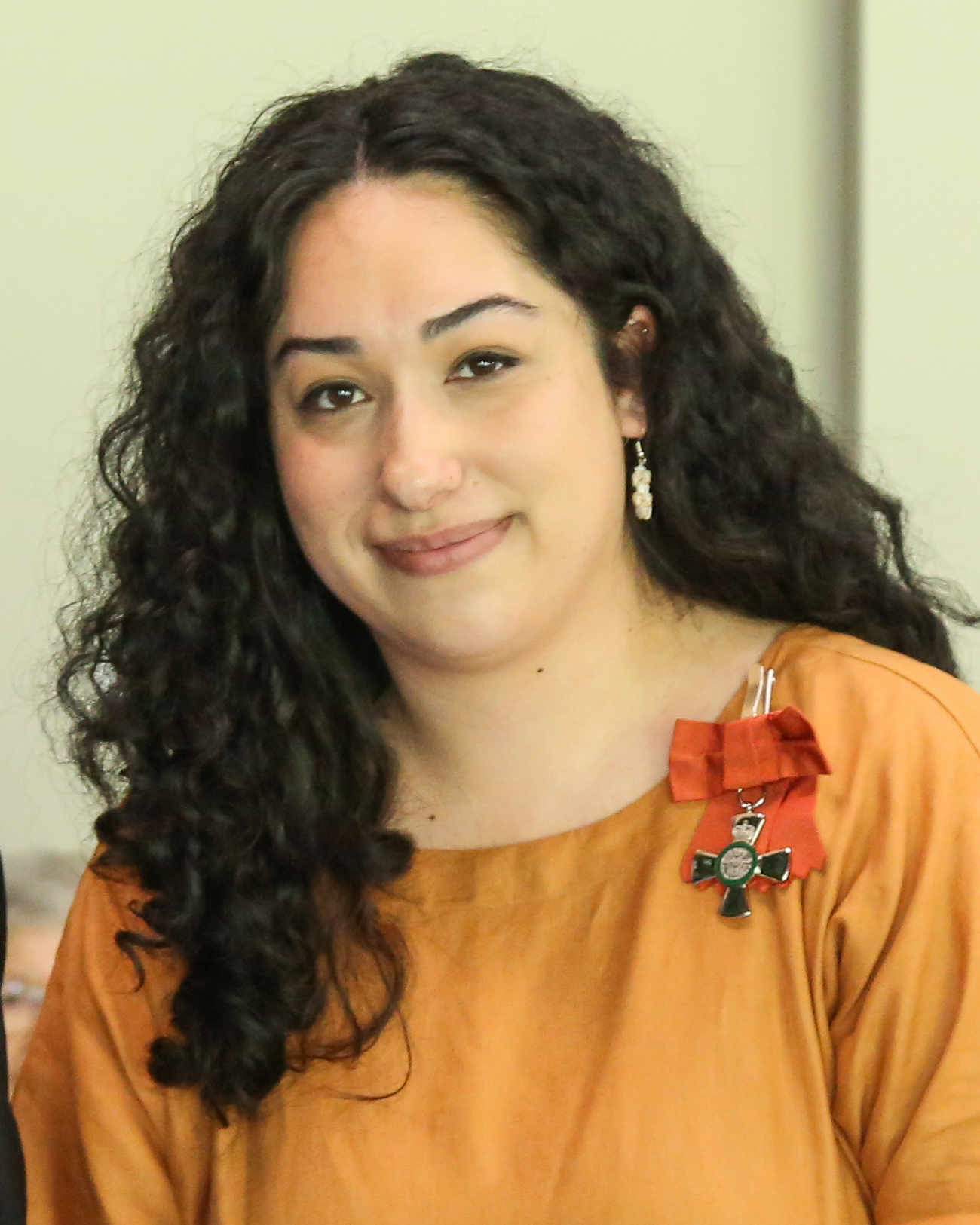
Lana Lopesi

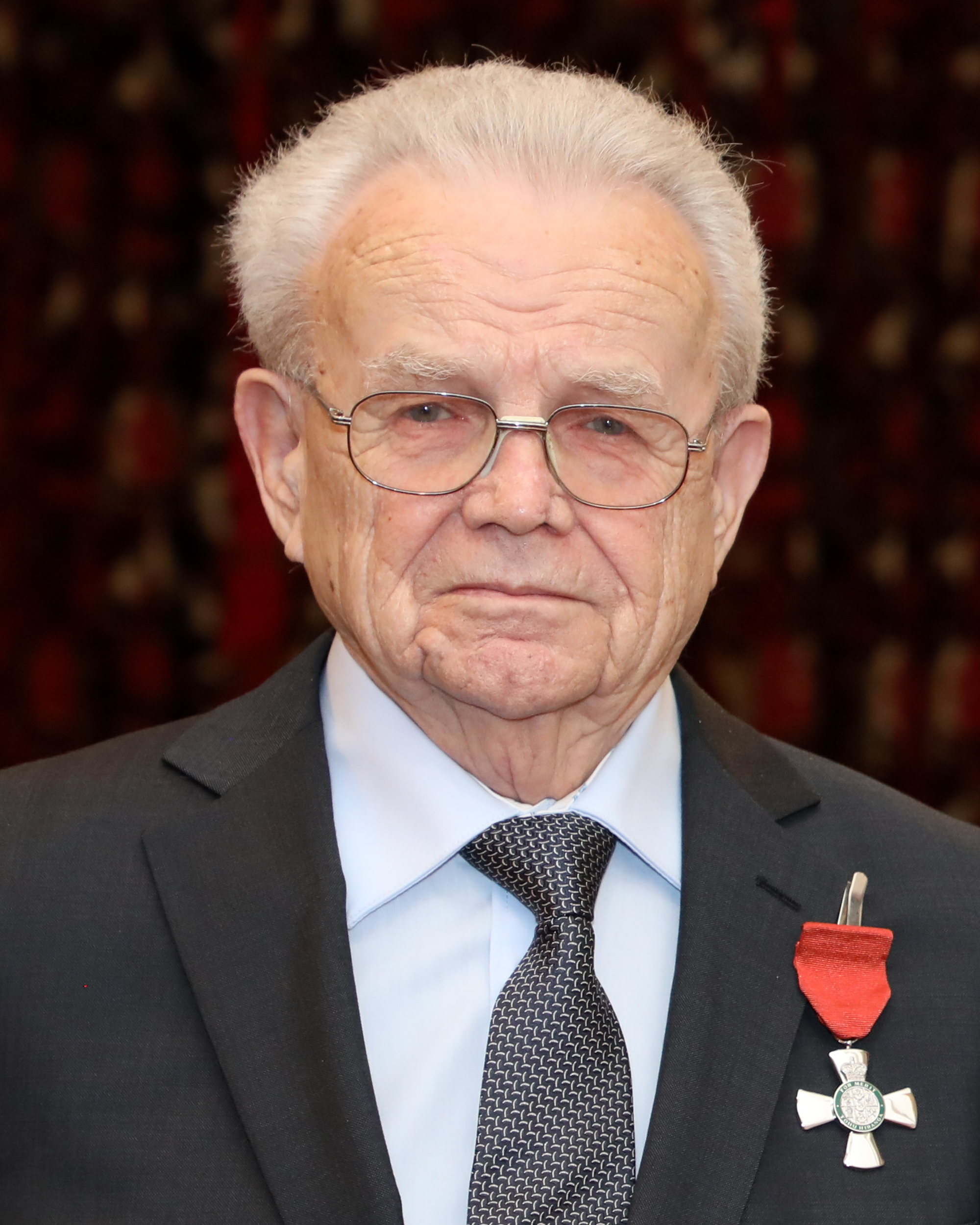
Stanislaw Manterys

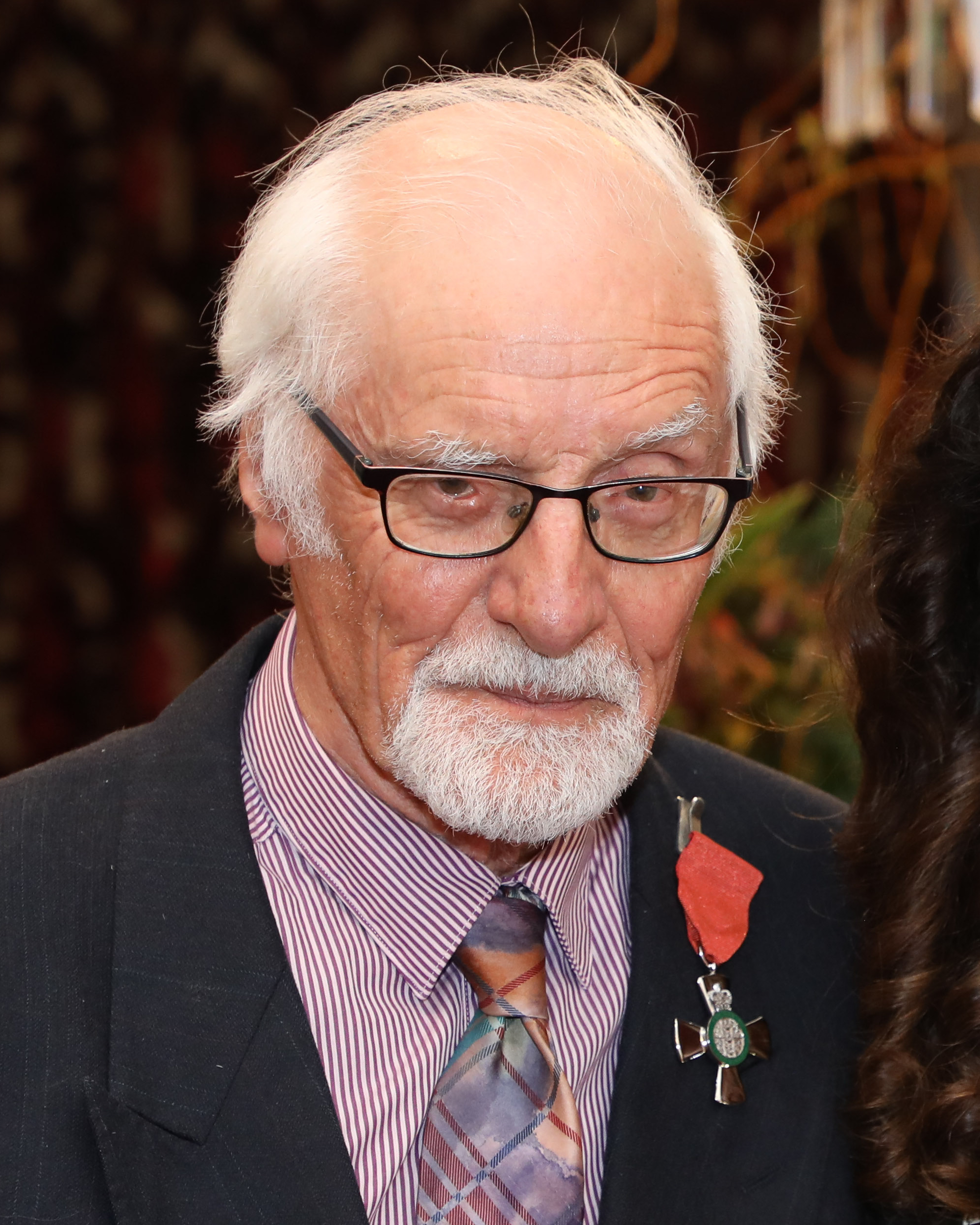
Paul Maunder

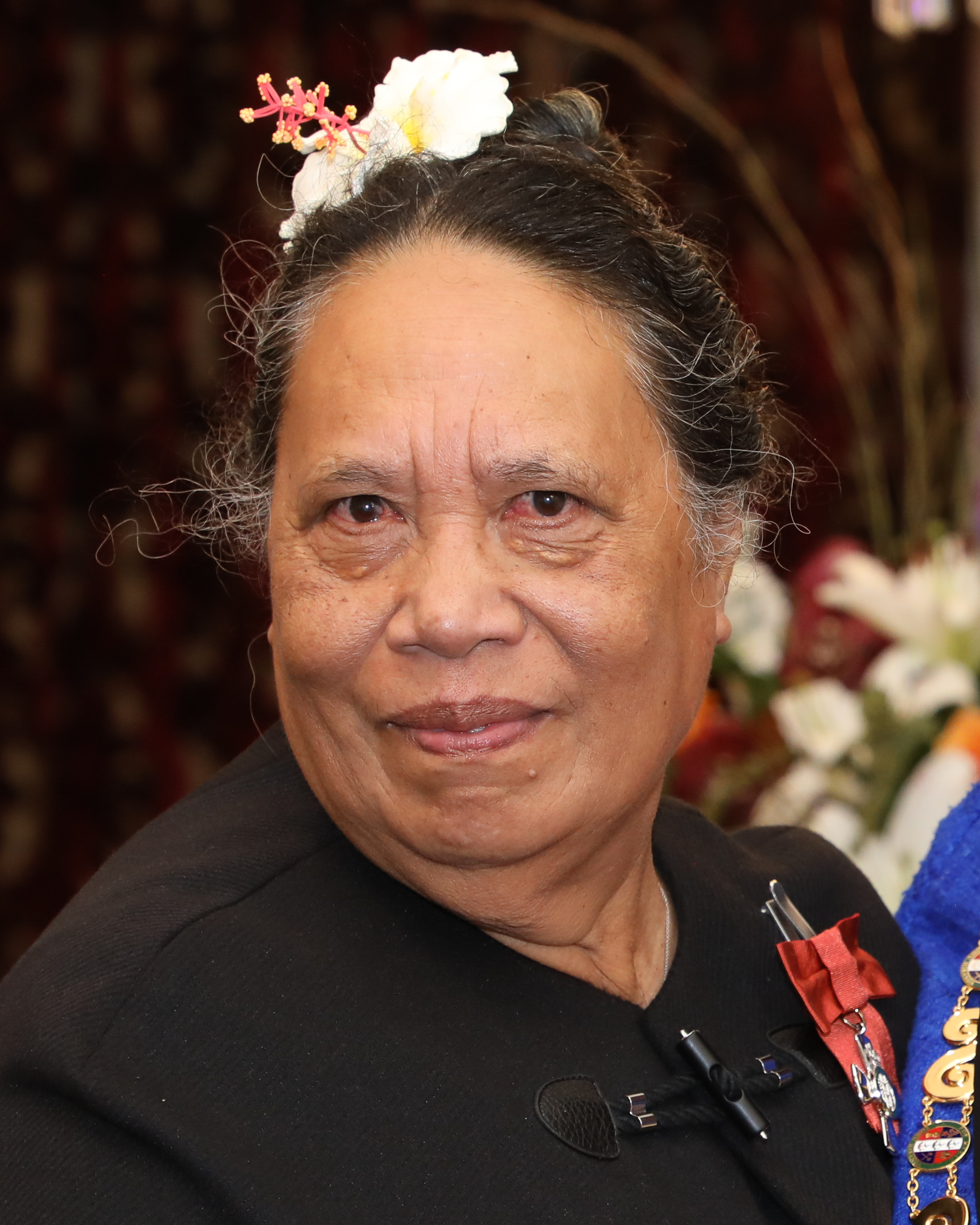
Ruta McKenzie

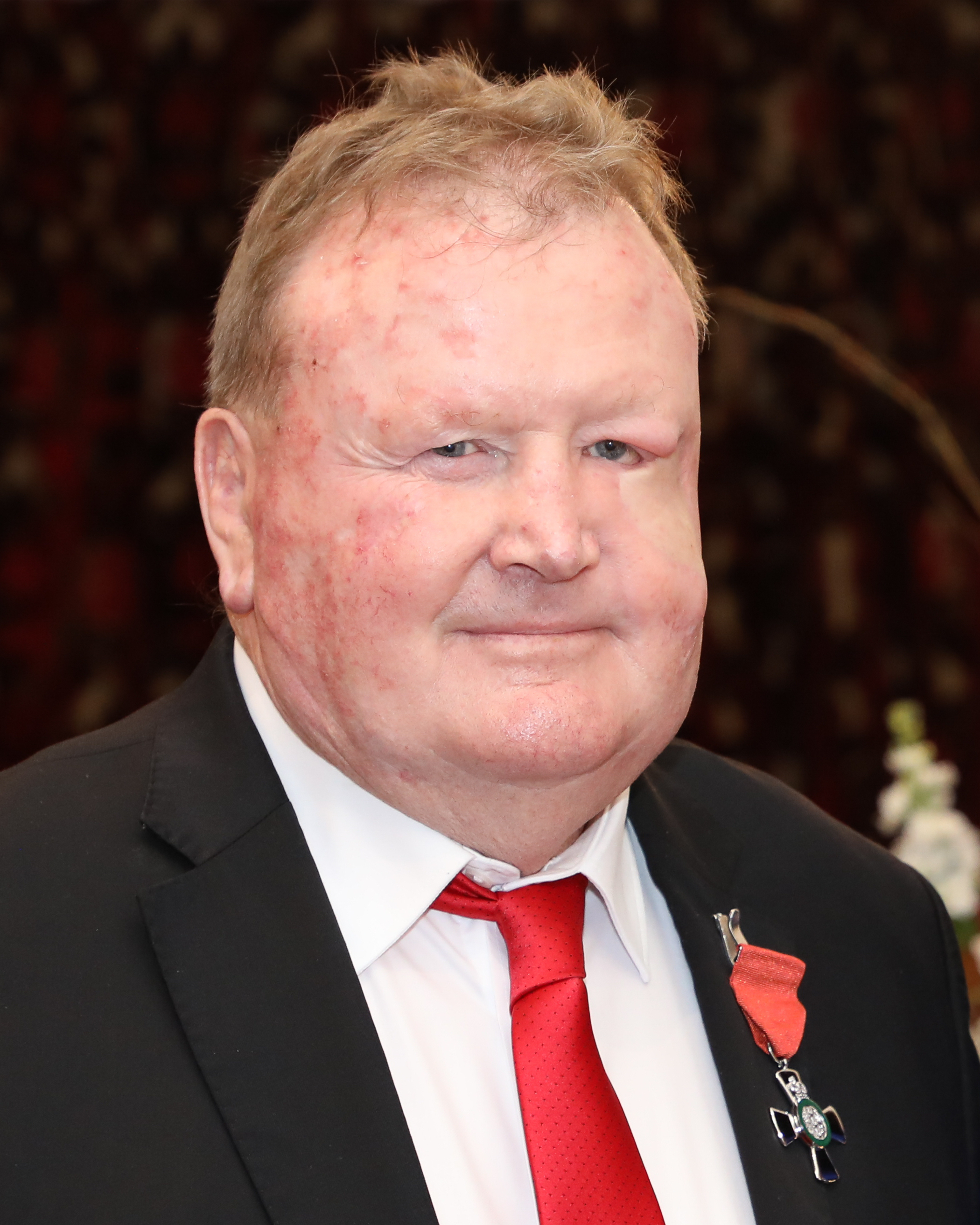
Mac McNamara

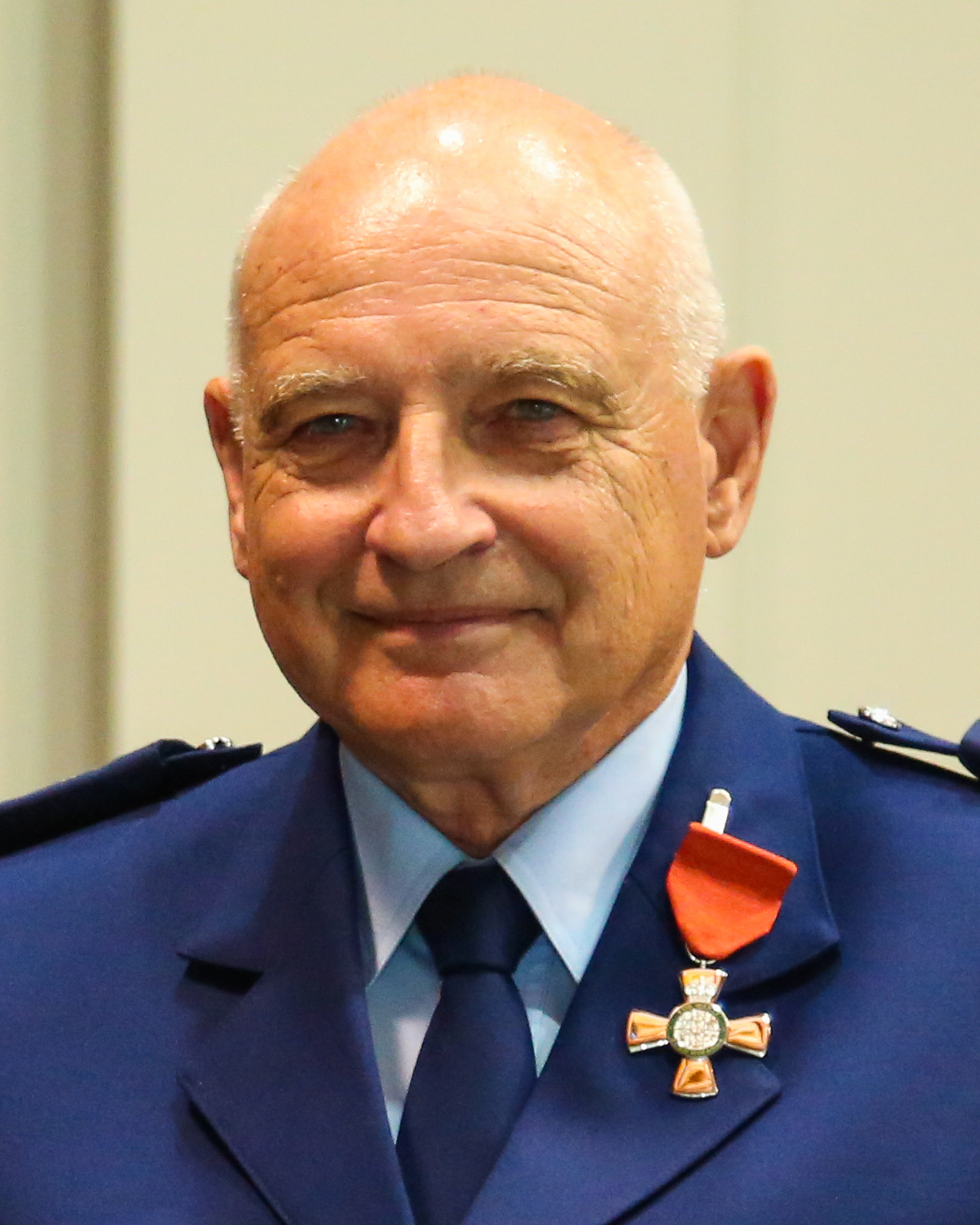
Cliff Metcalfe

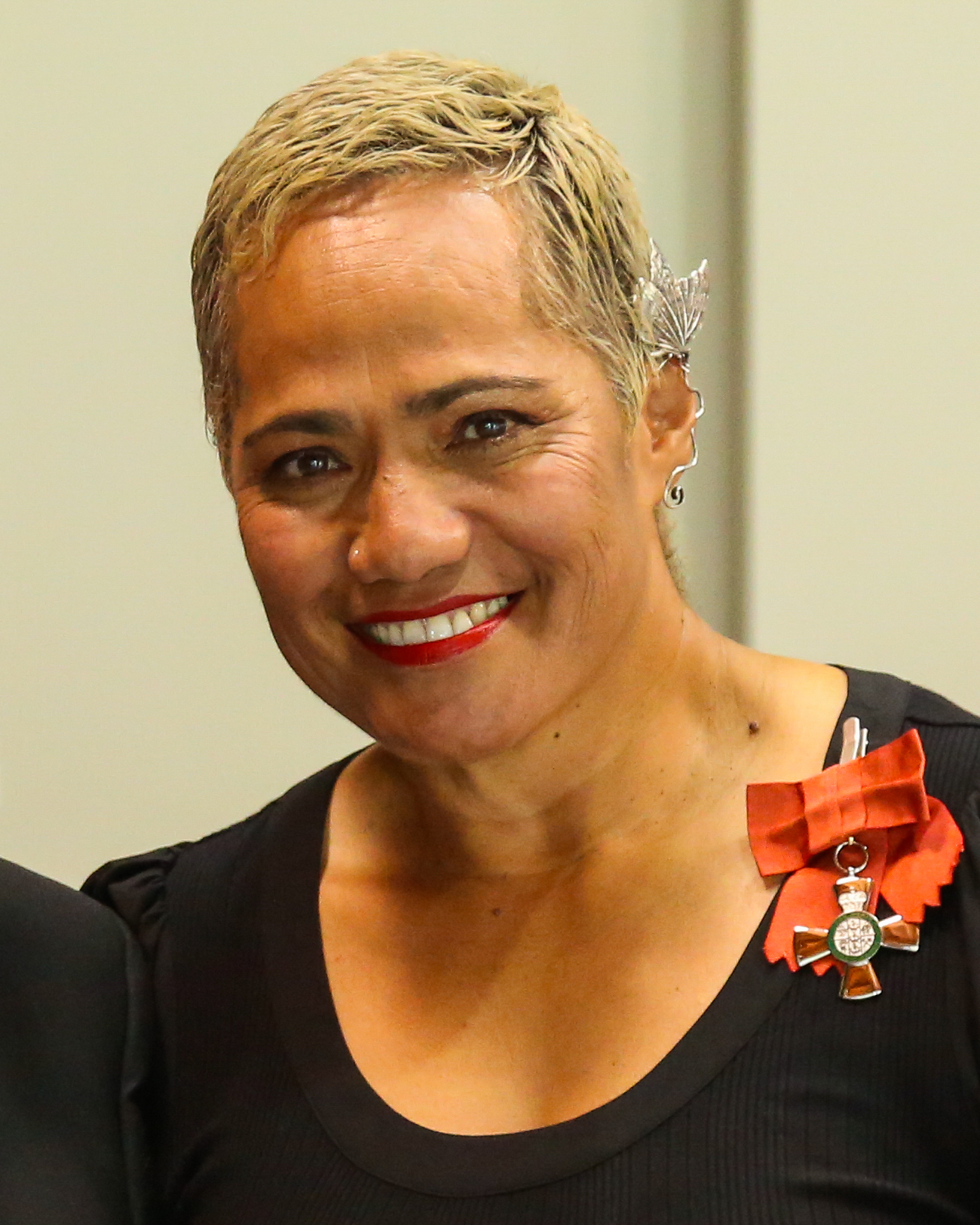
Betty-Anne Monga

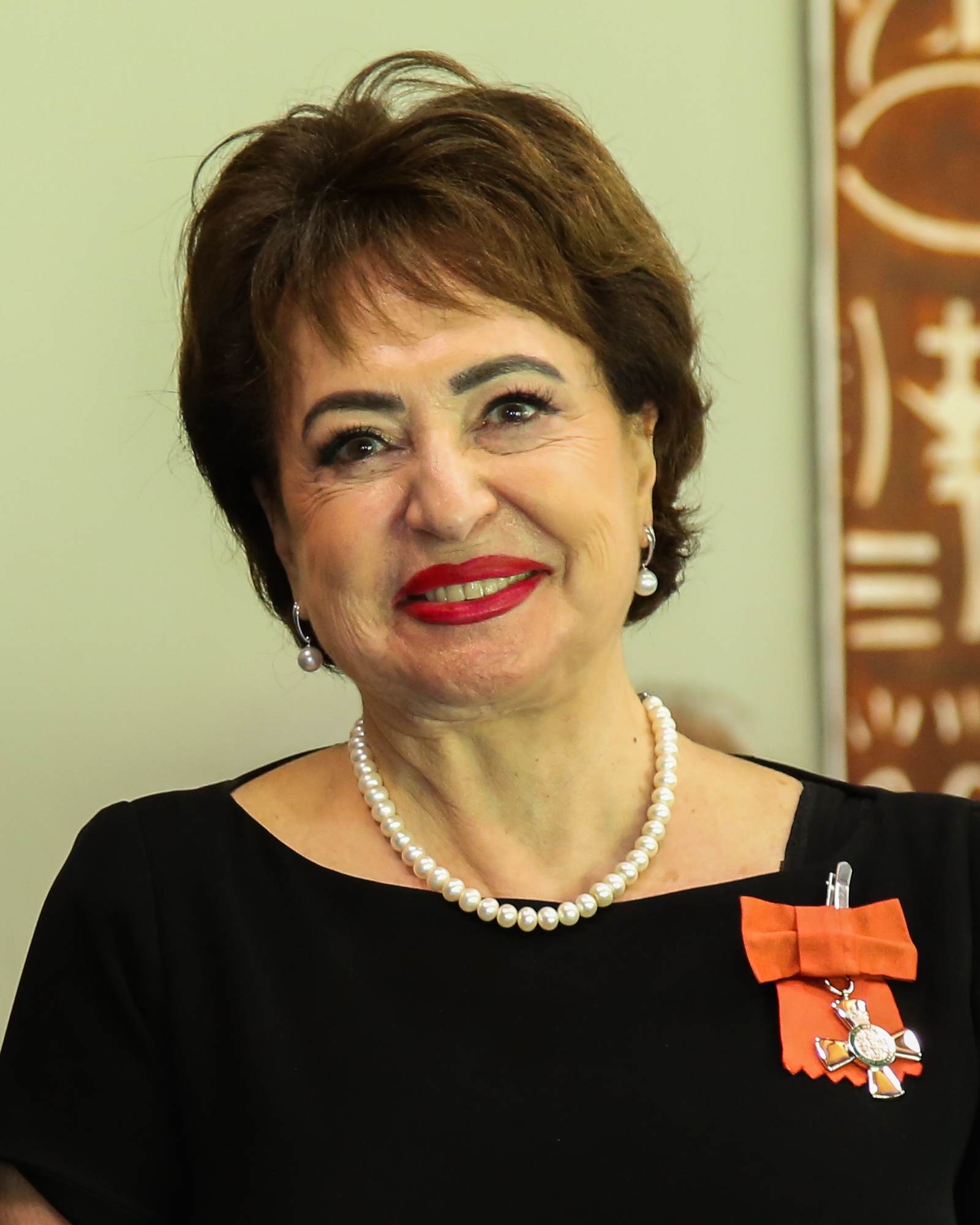
Henriette Nakhle

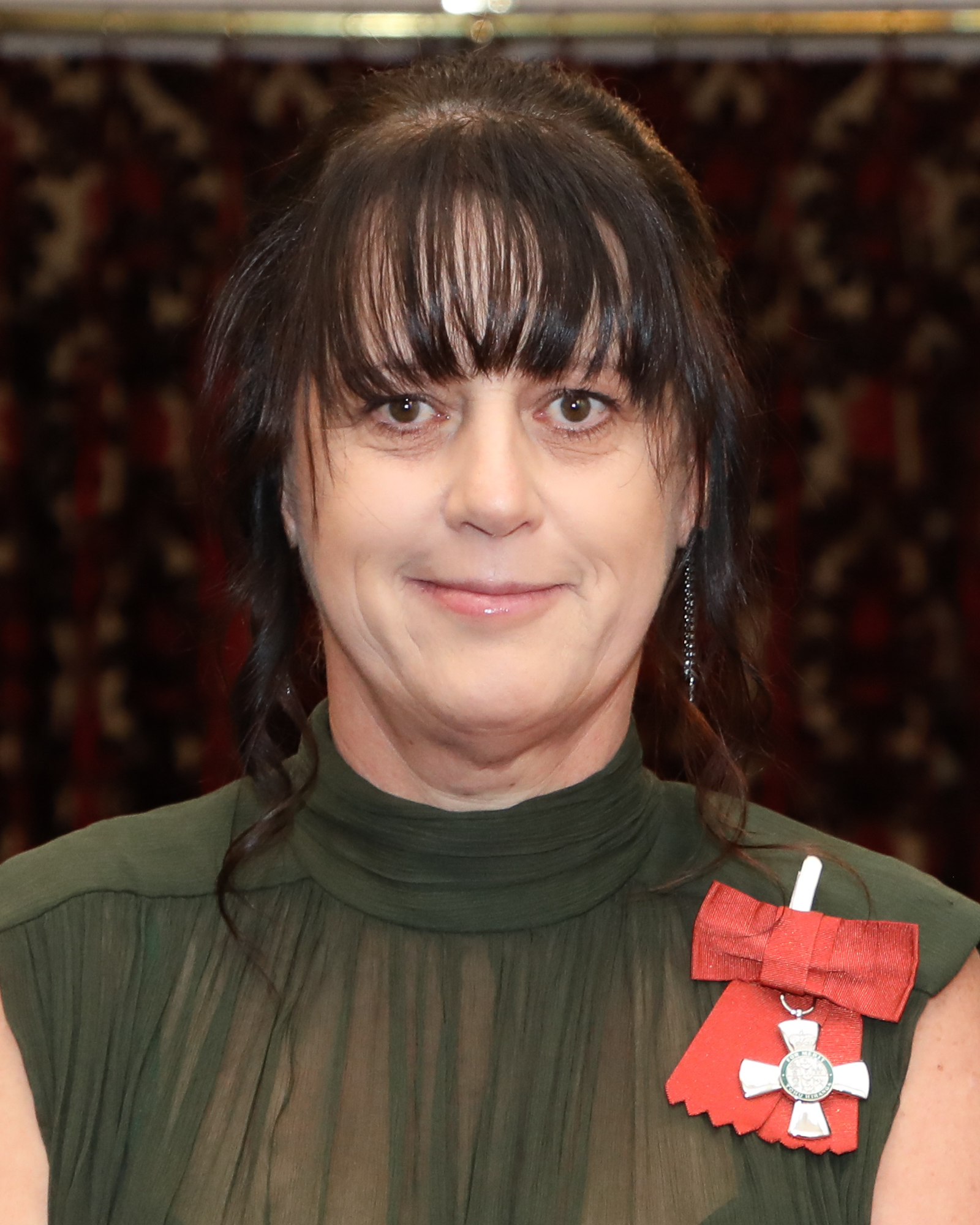
Melony O'Connor

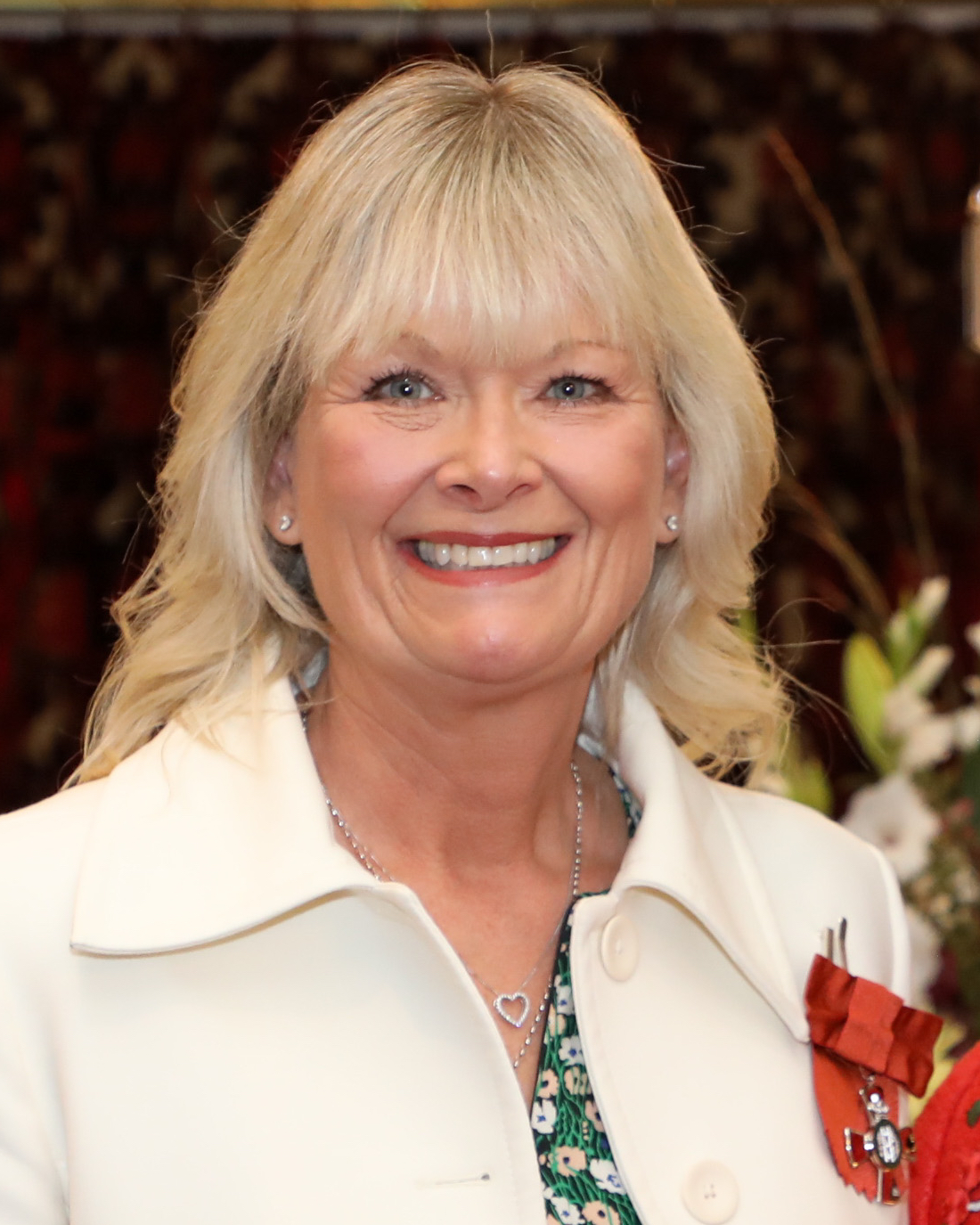
Joc O'Donnell

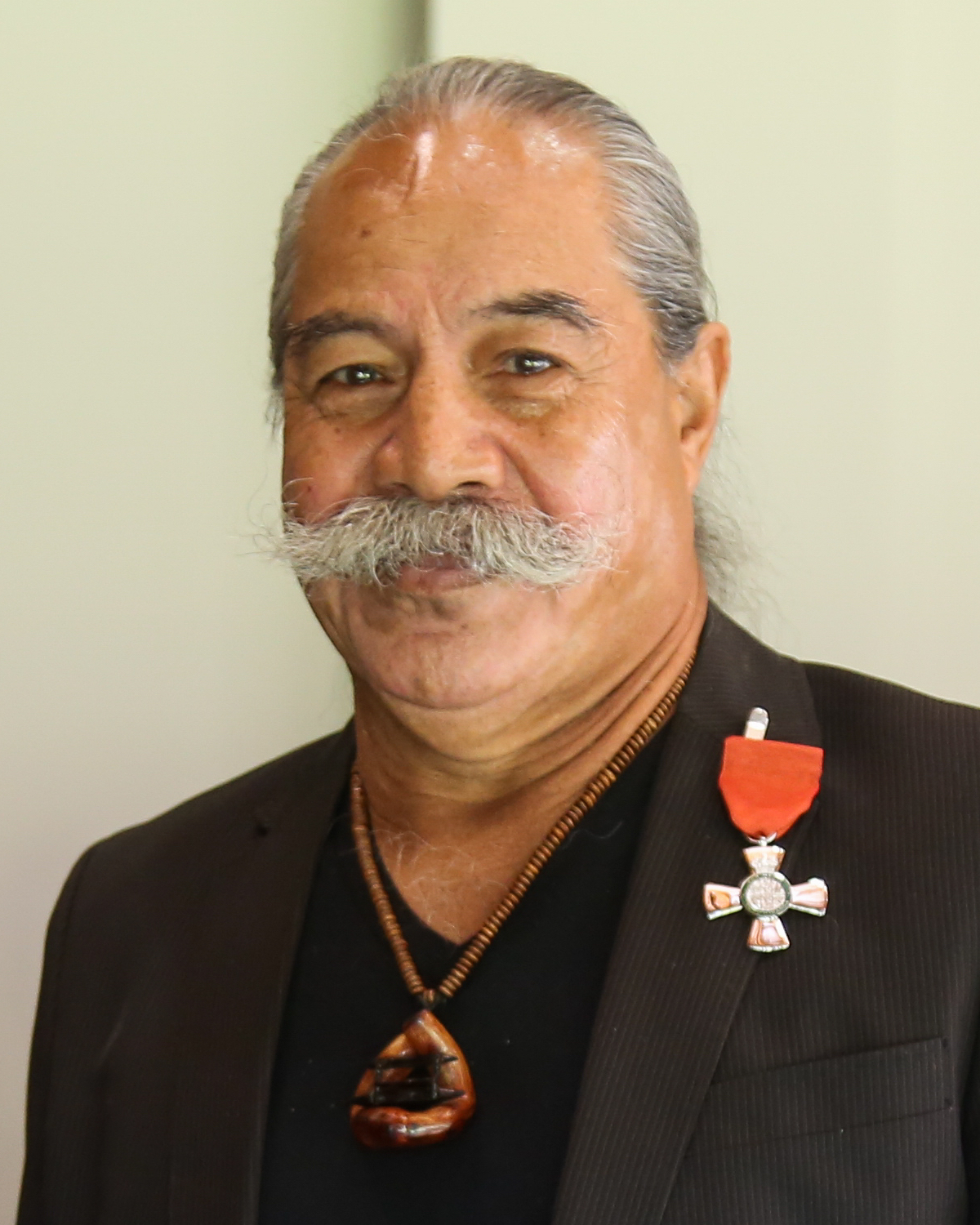
Sully Paea

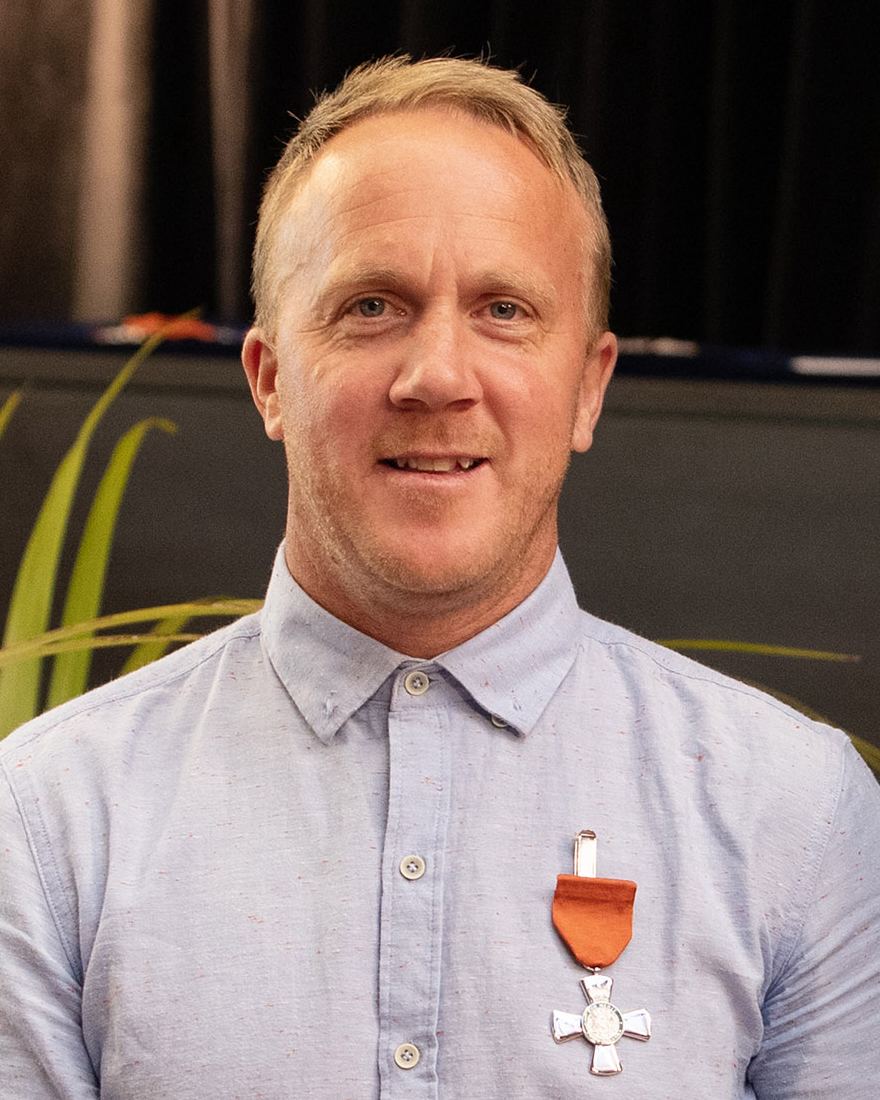
Corey Peters

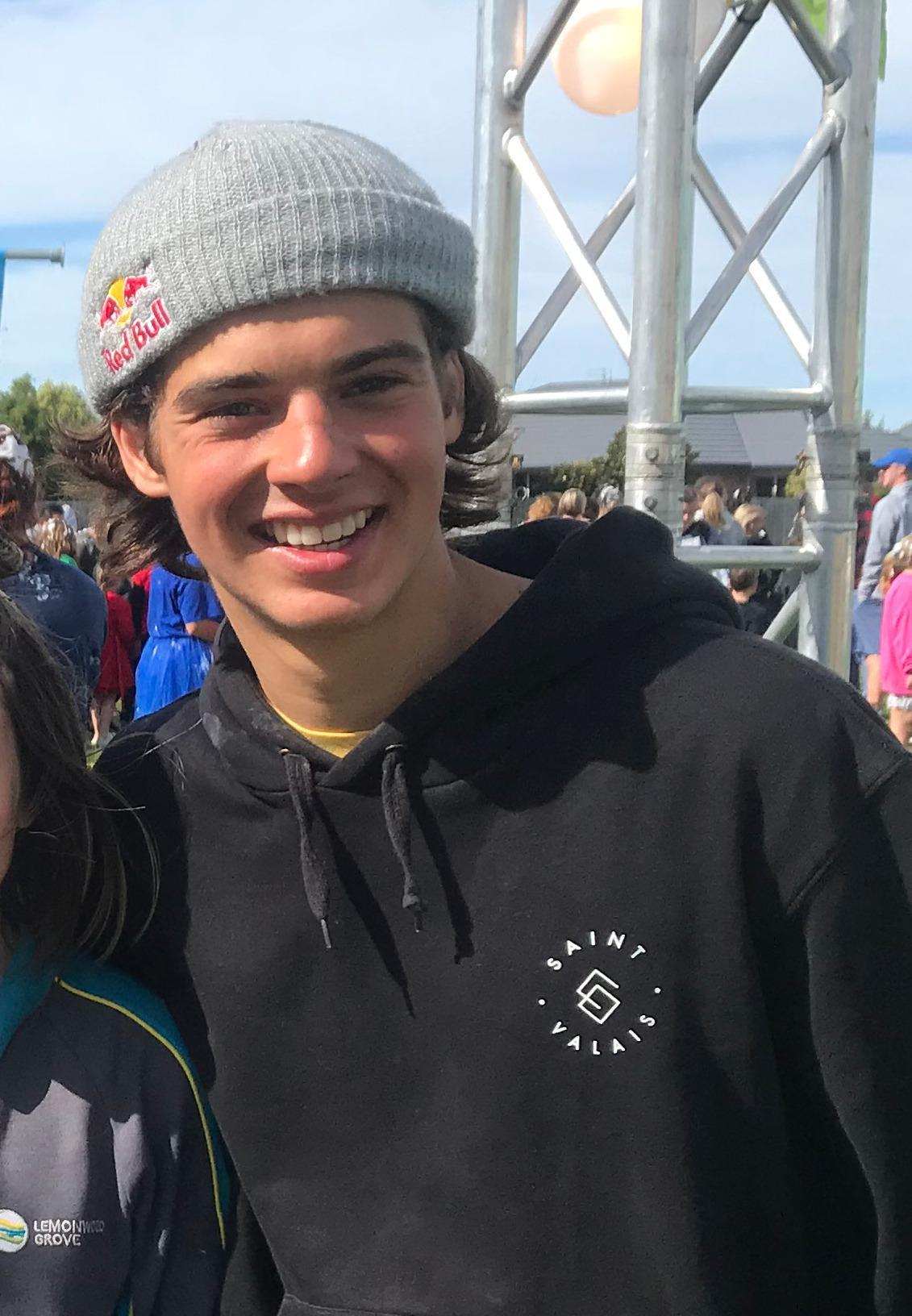
Nico Porteous

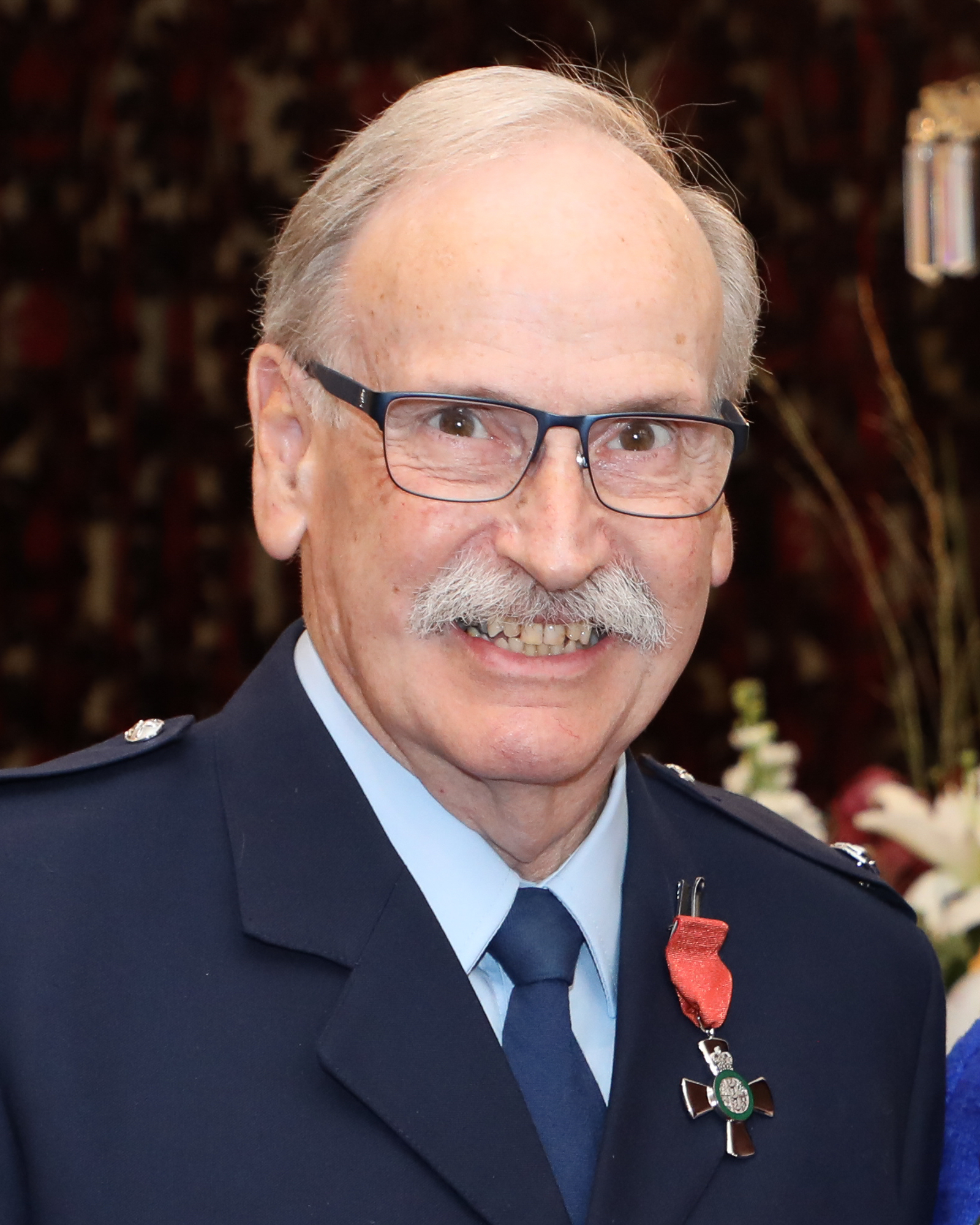
Russell Postlewaight

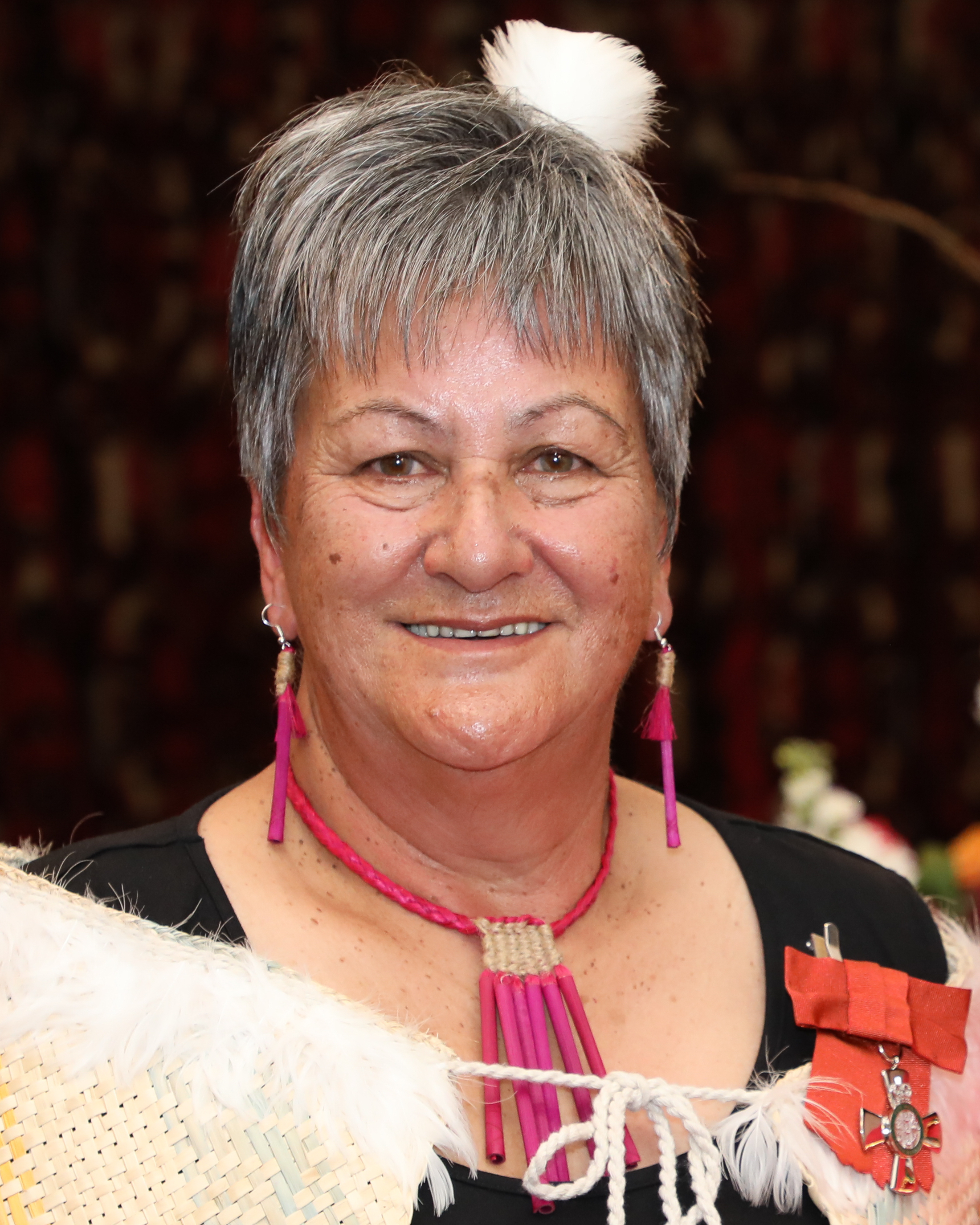
Rita Powick

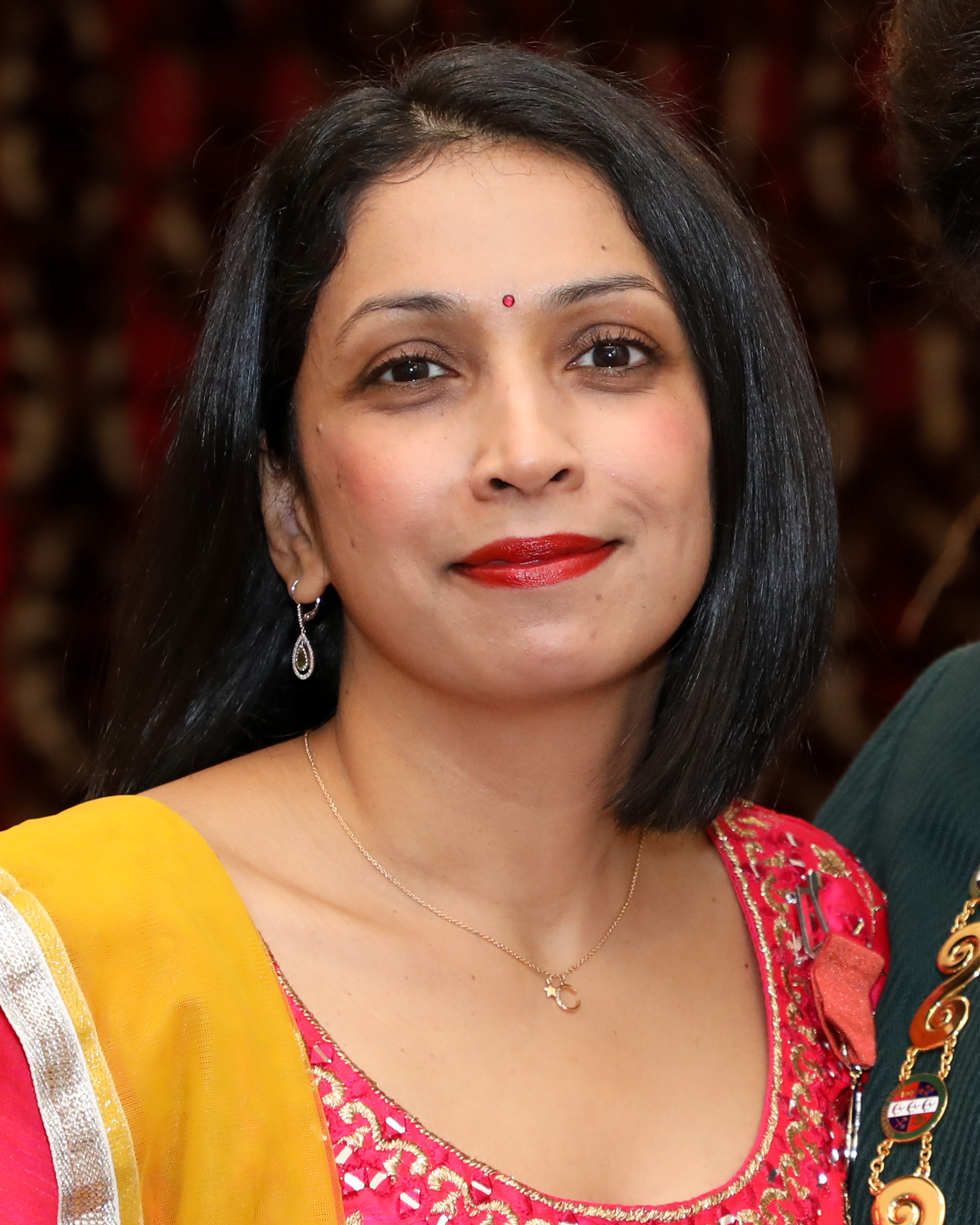
Shirleen Prasad

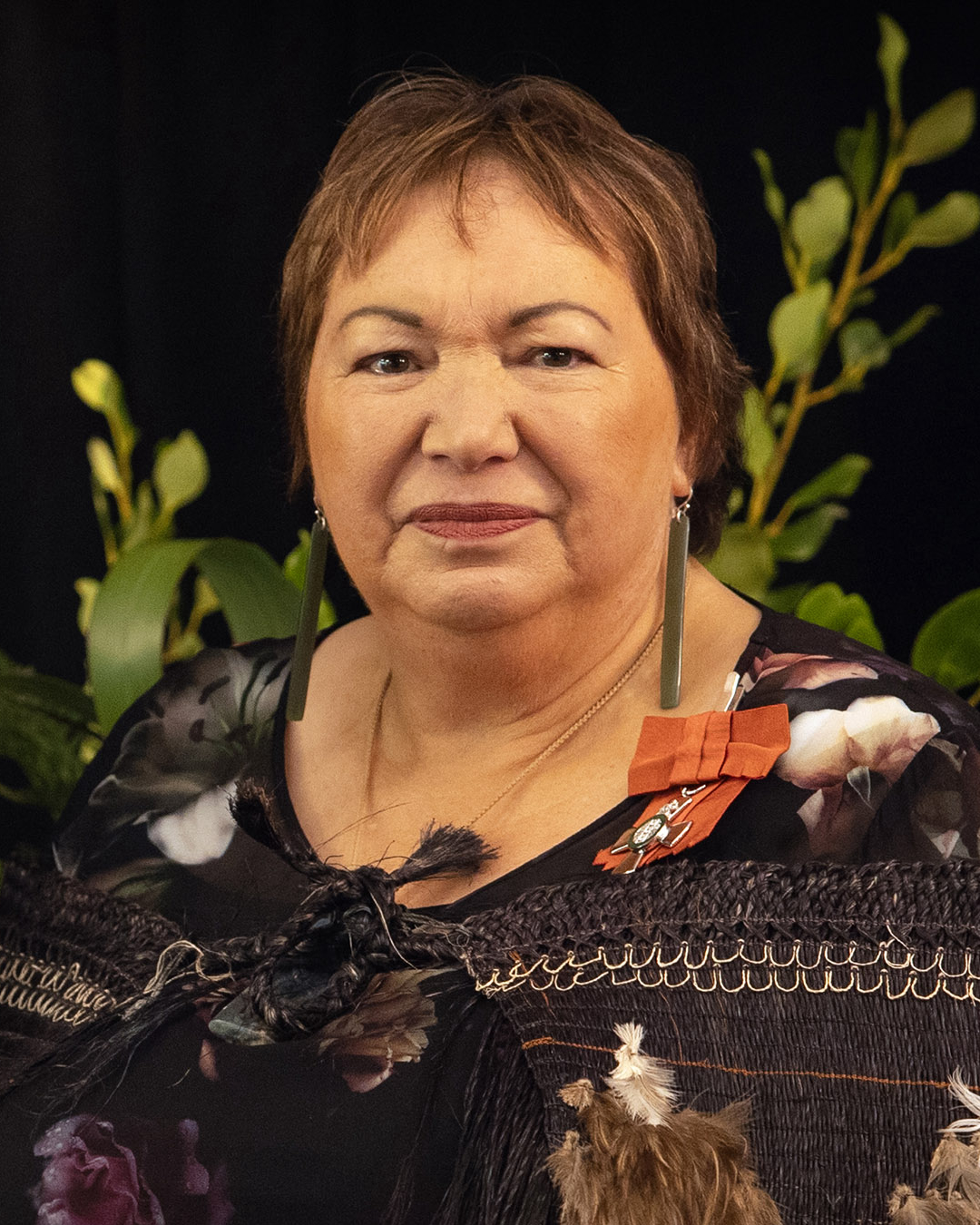
Helen Rasmussen

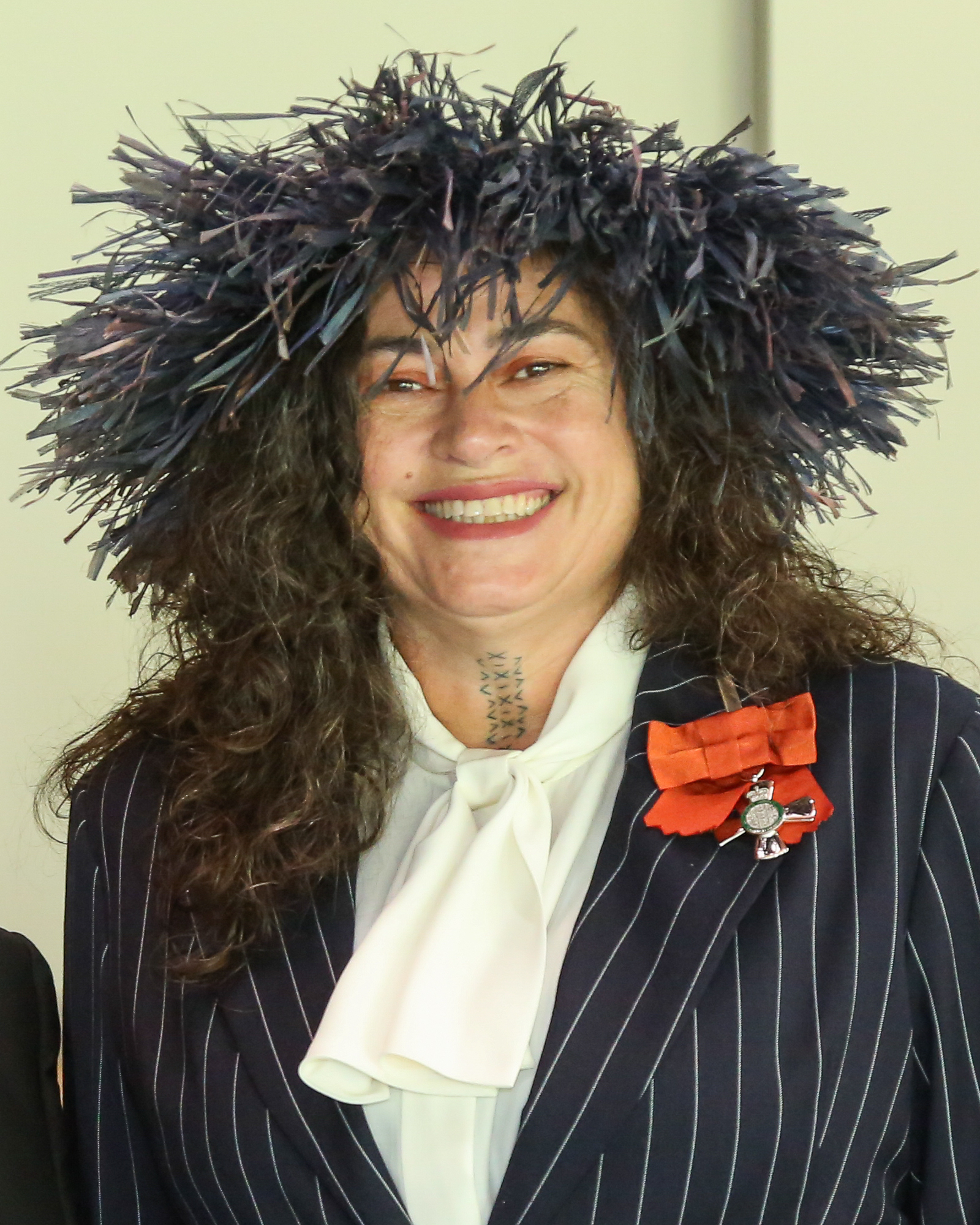
Rosanna Raymond

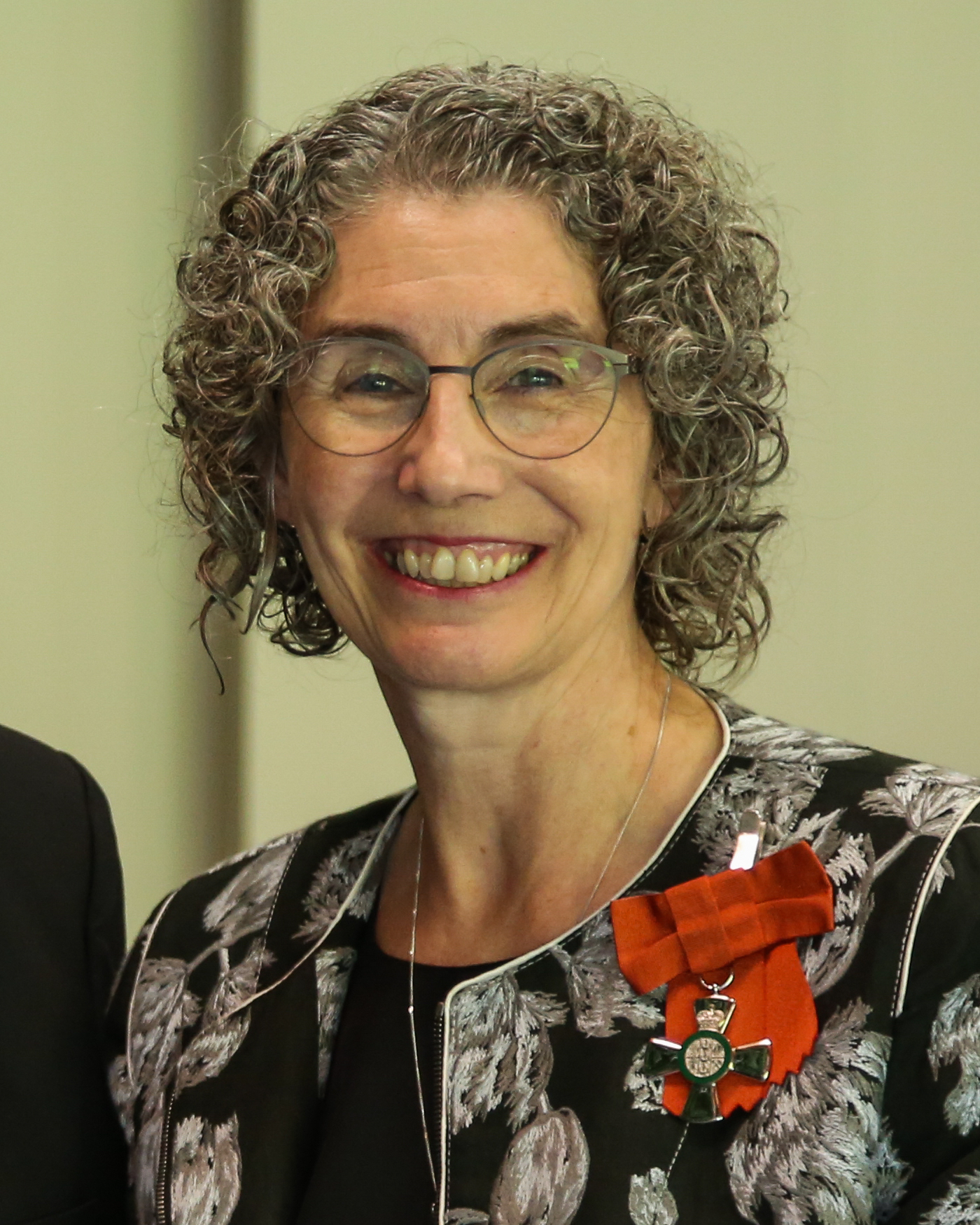
Bonnie Robinson

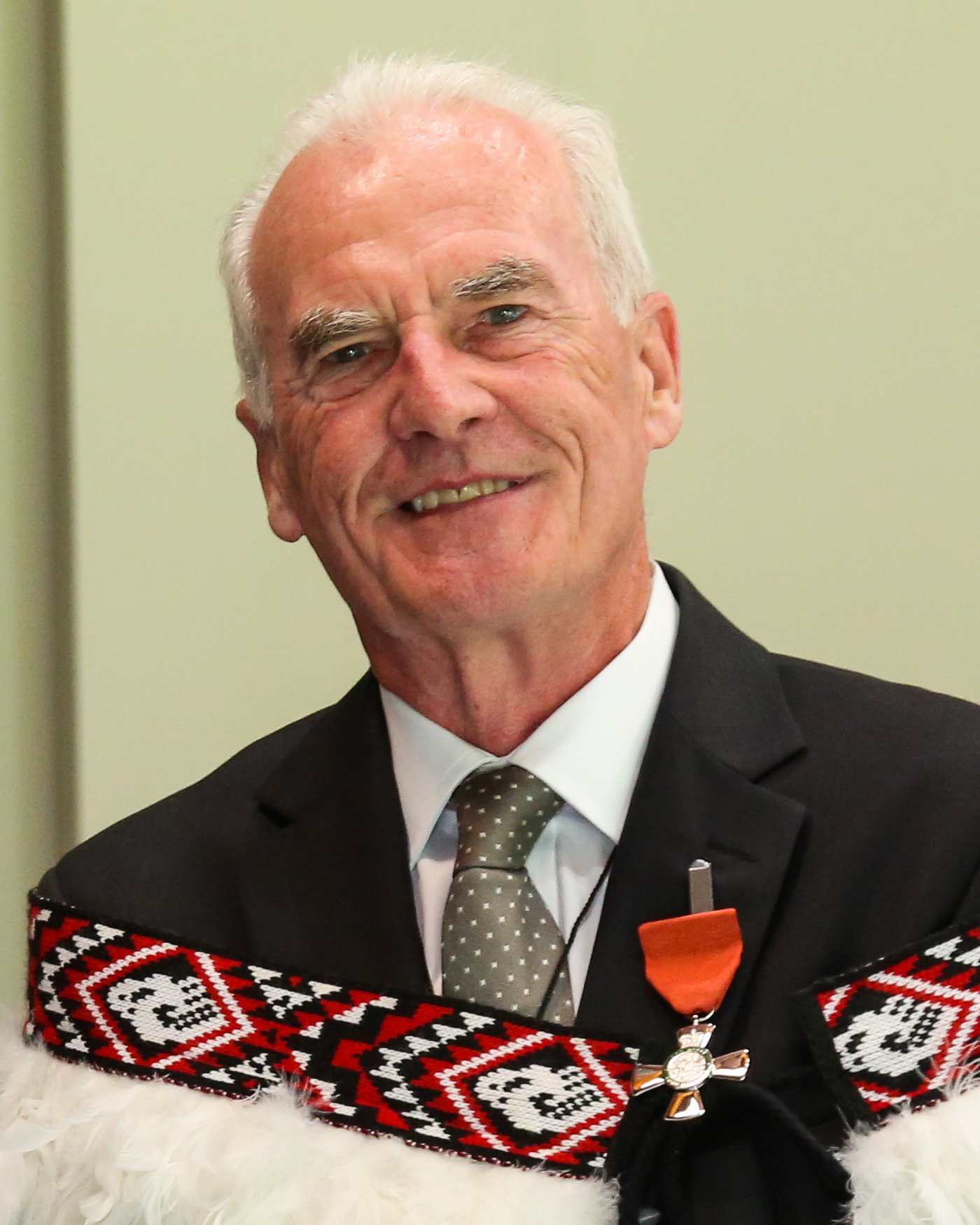
Chris Rooney

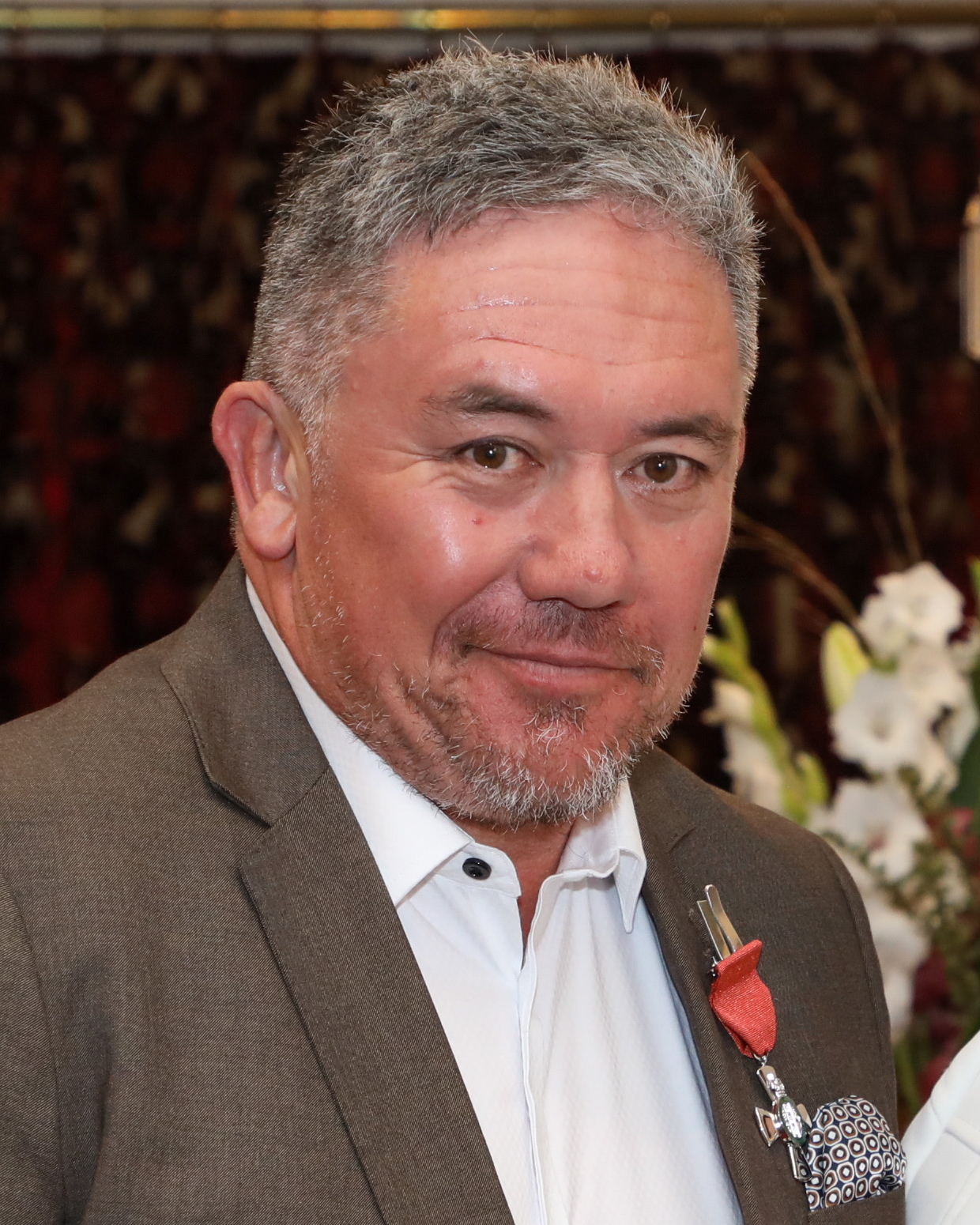
Reweti Ropiha

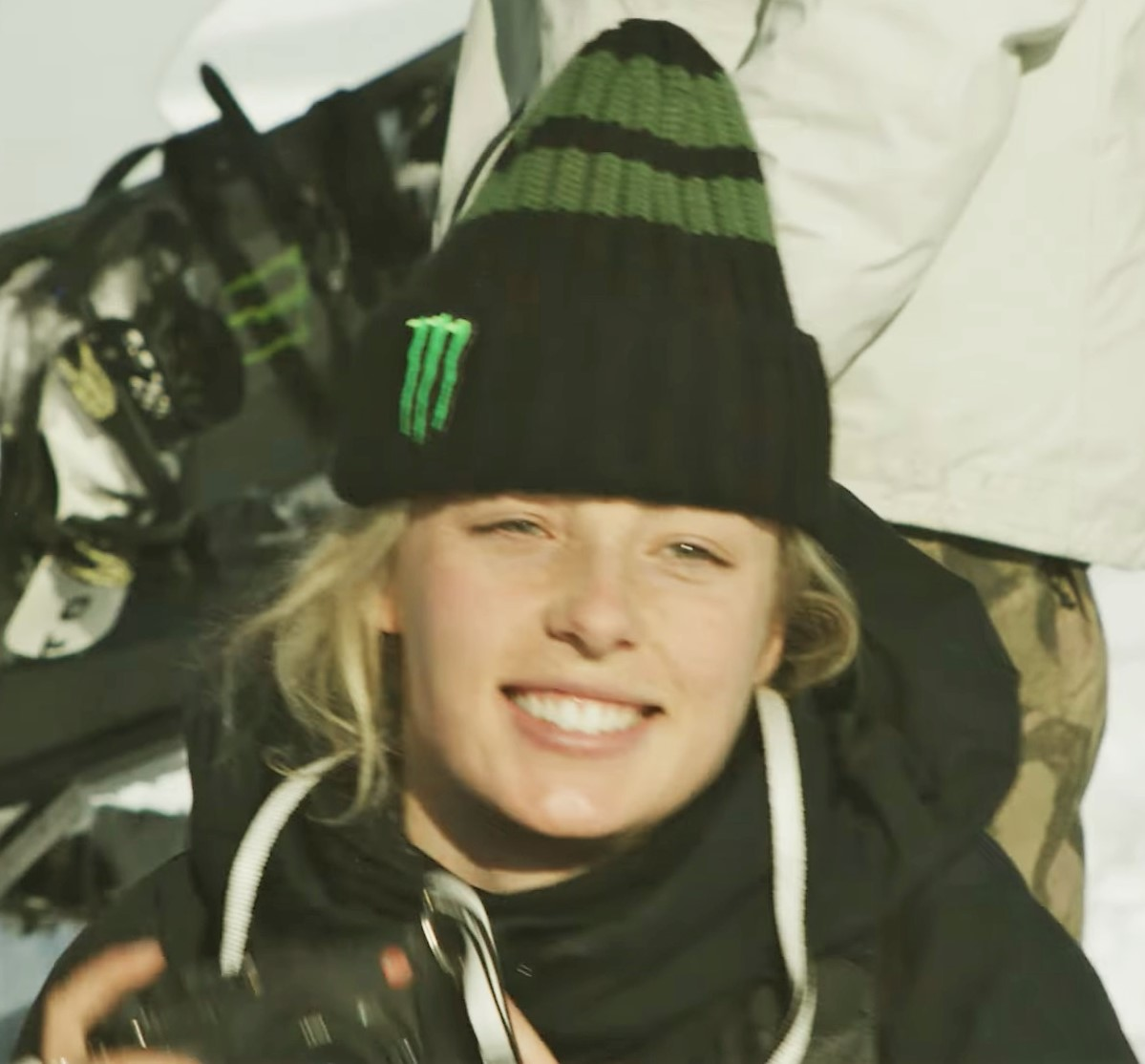
Zoi Sadowski-Synnott

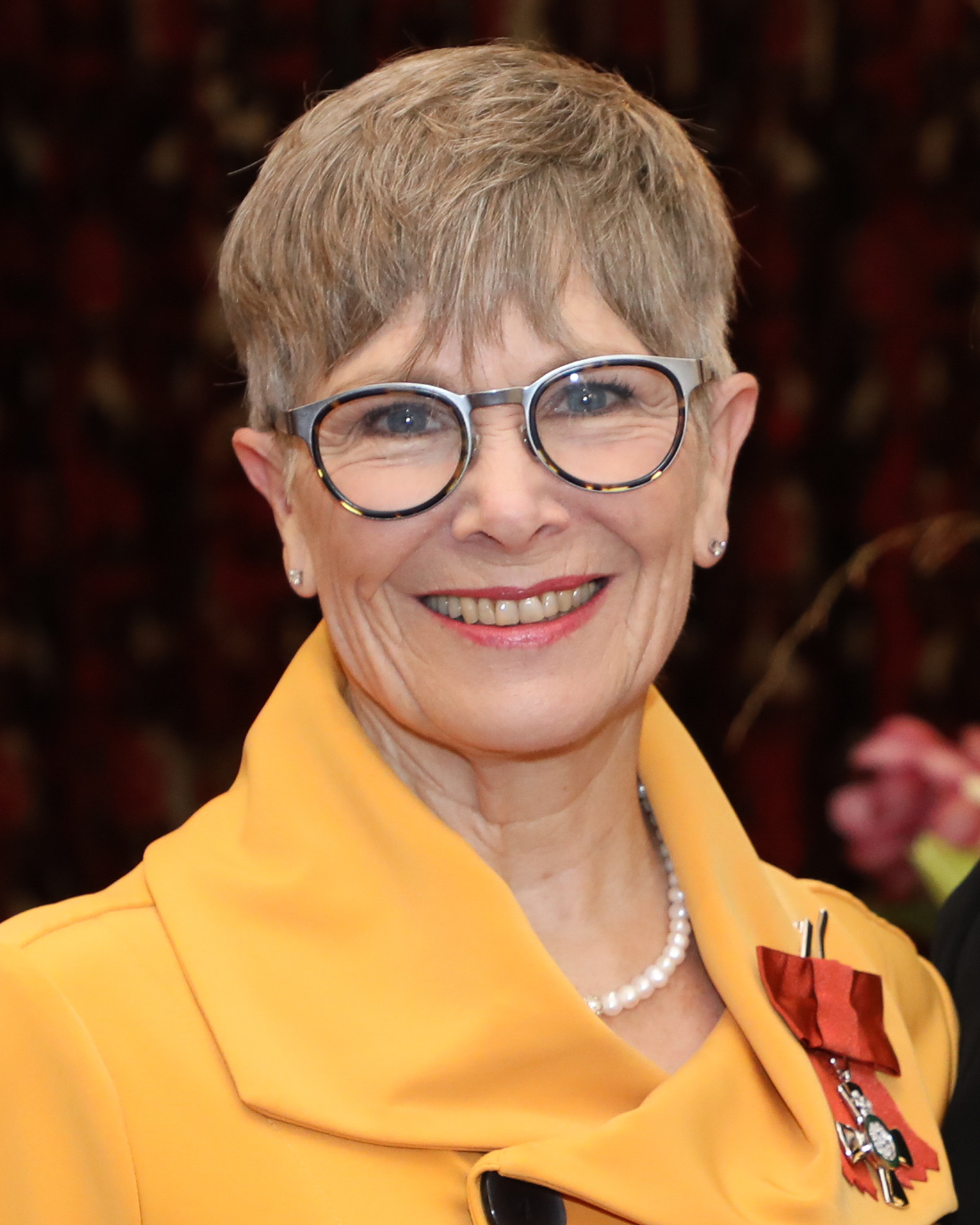
Jenny Shattock

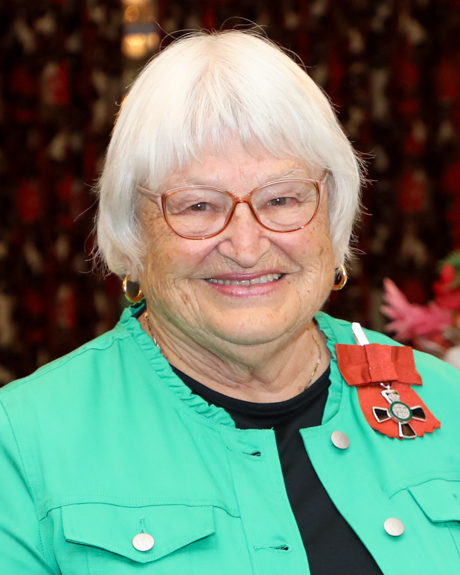
Sally Shaw

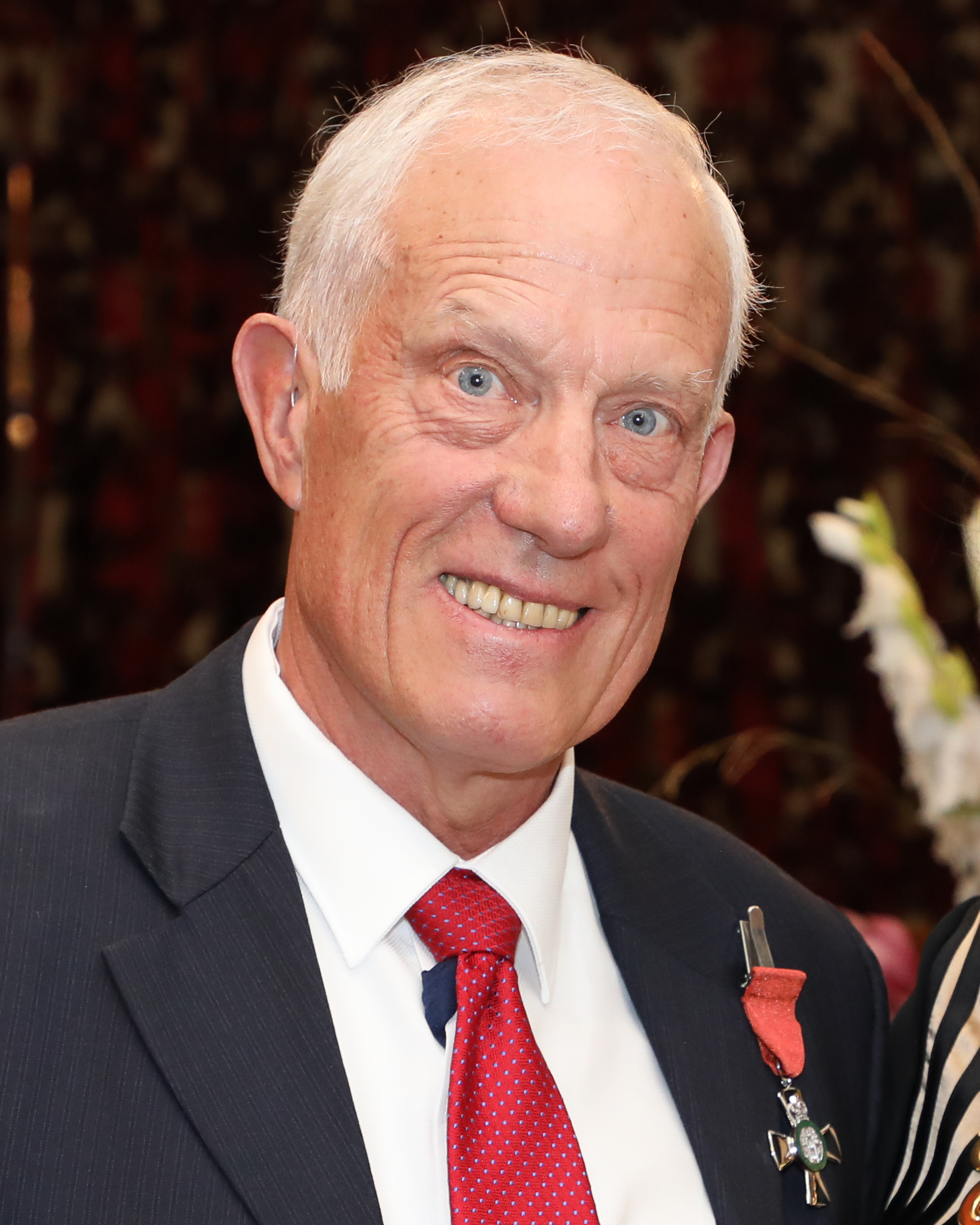
Greg Sherley

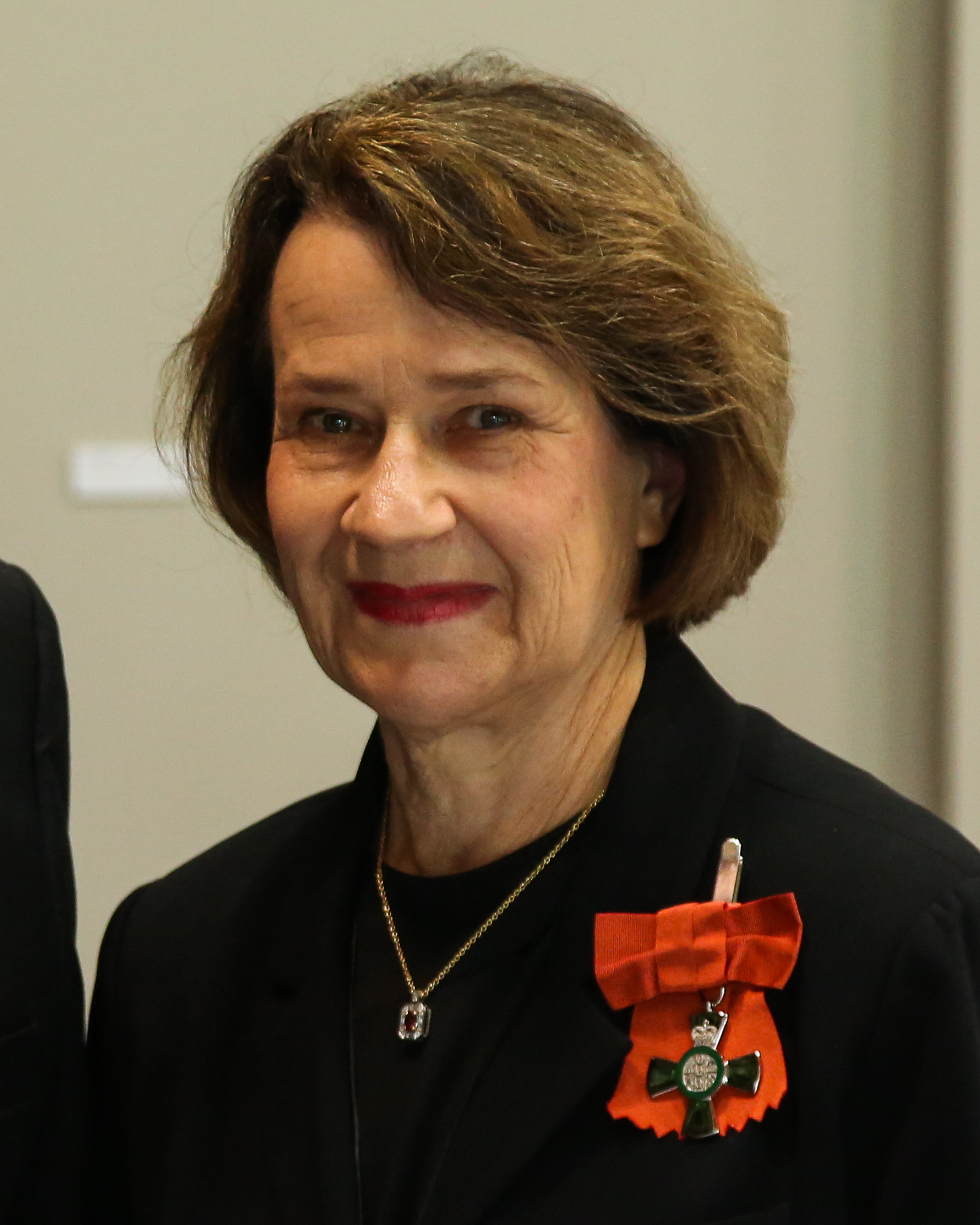
Jane Skeen

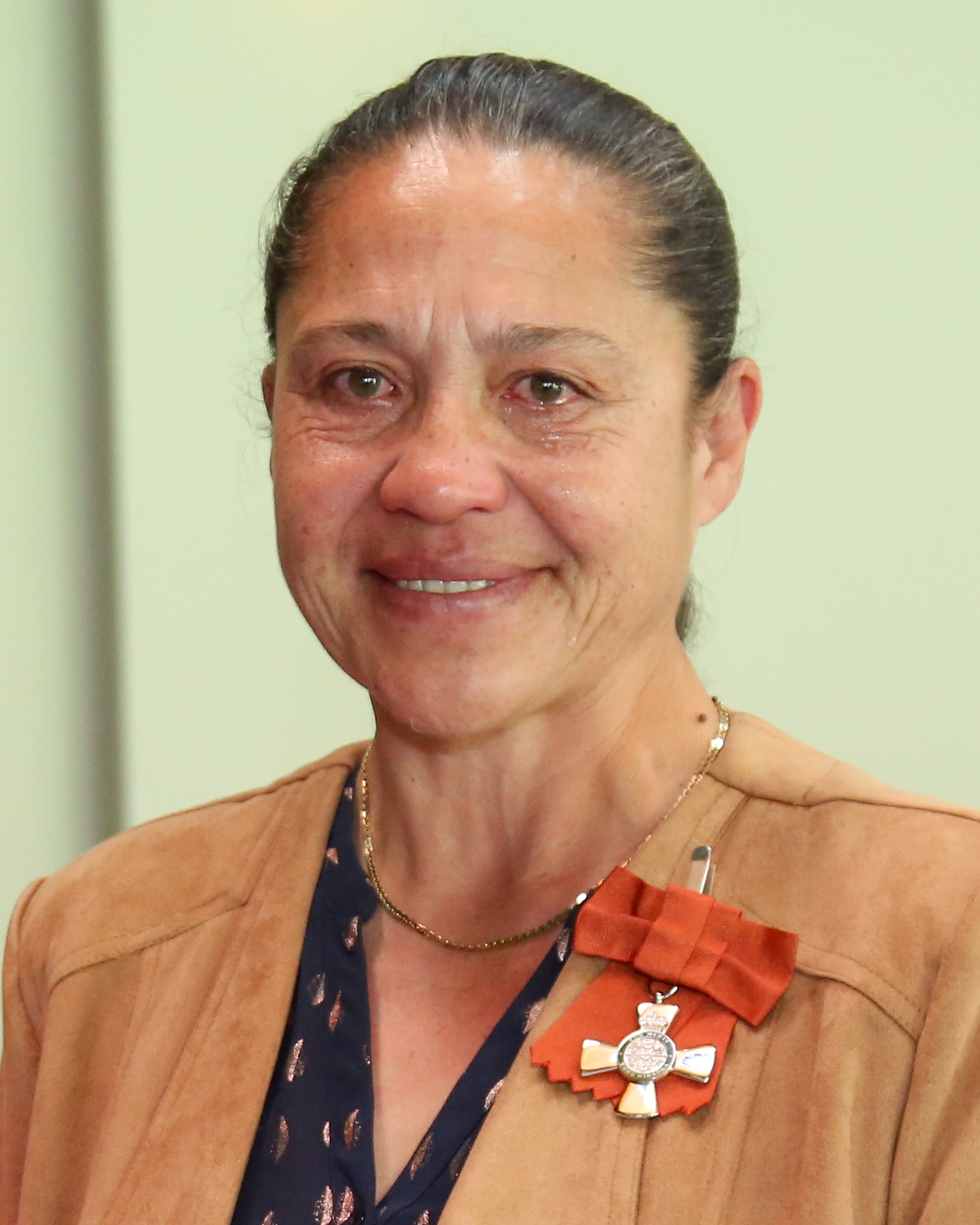
Cheryl Smith

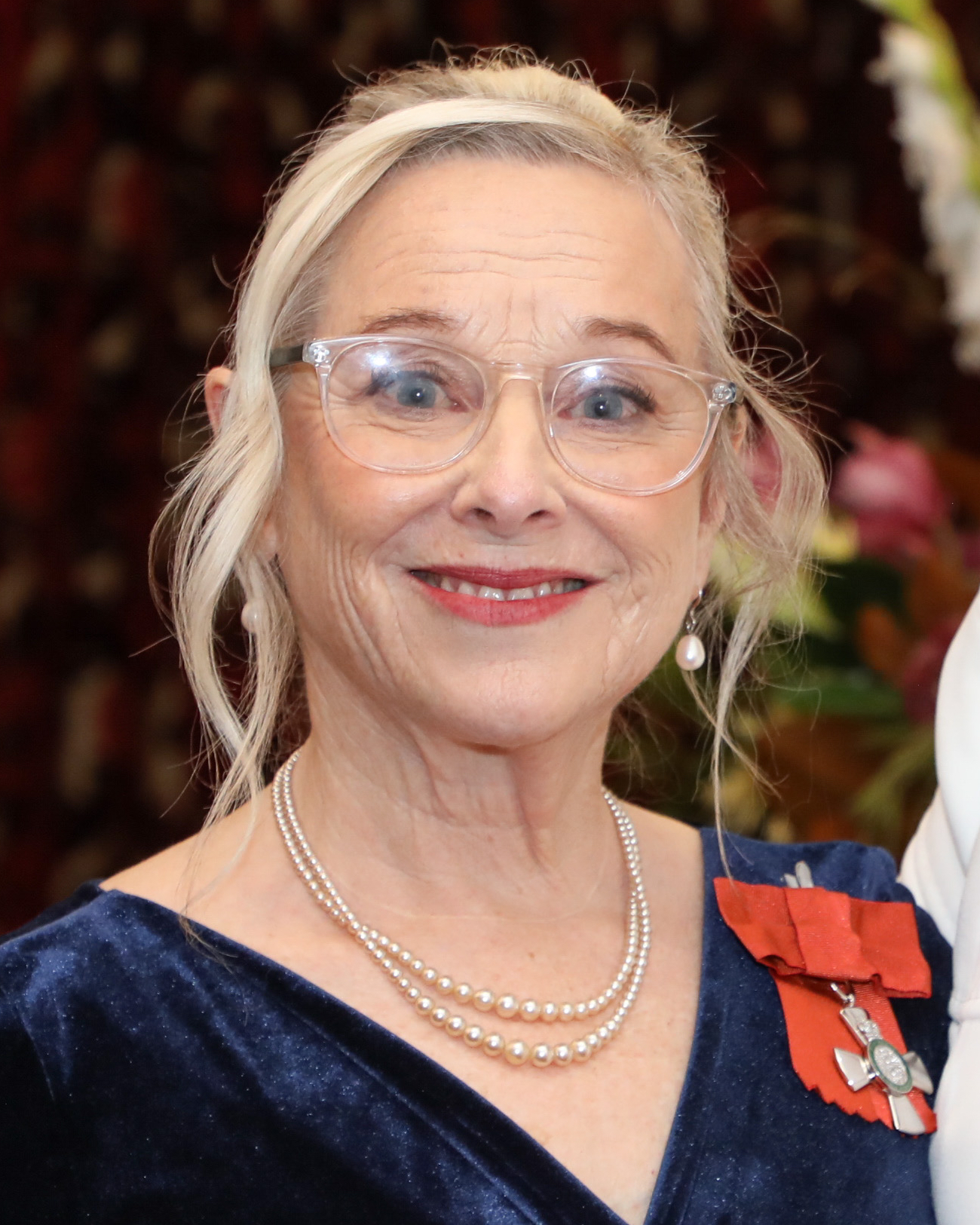
Maggy Tai Rākena

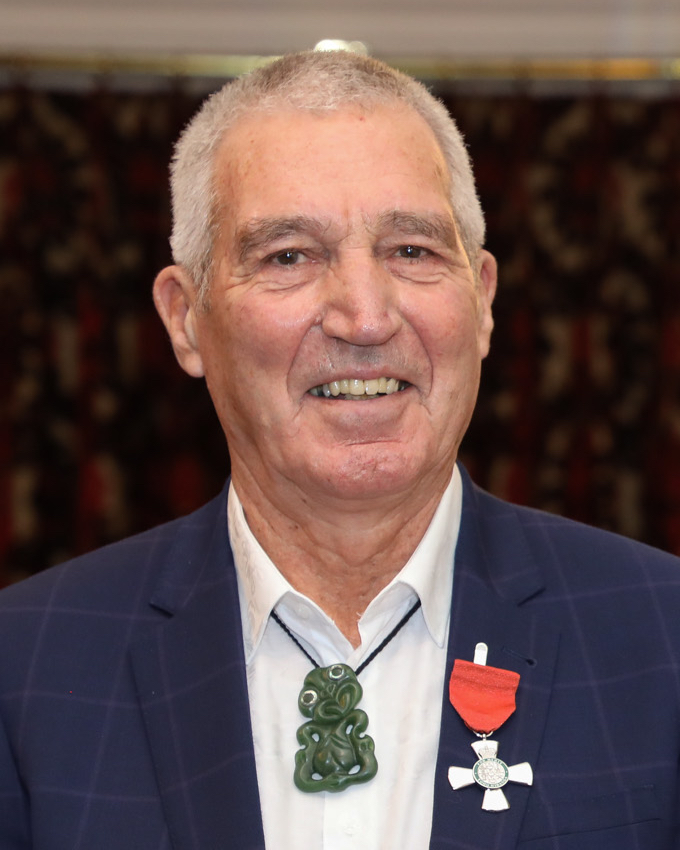
John Tait

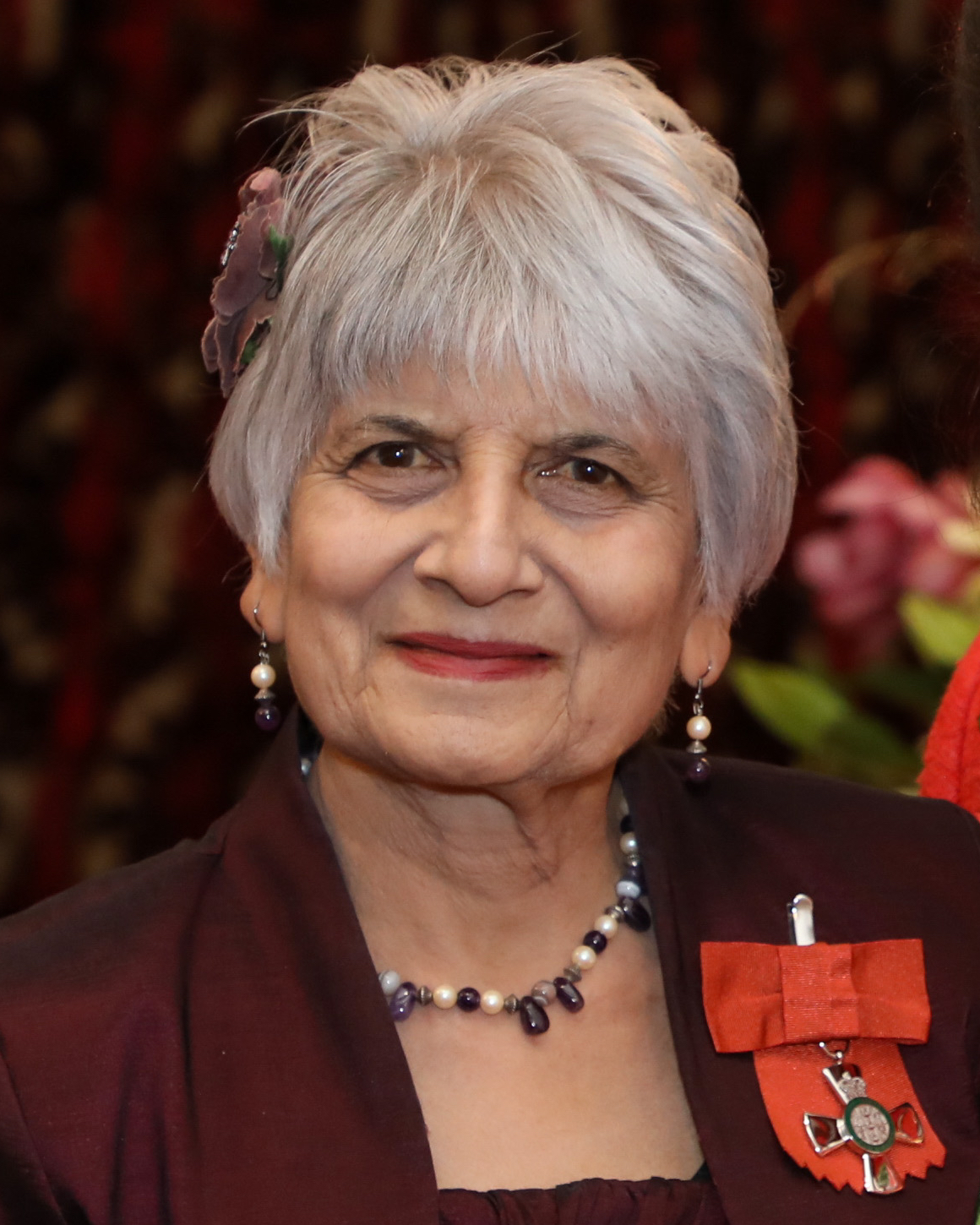
Amama Thornley

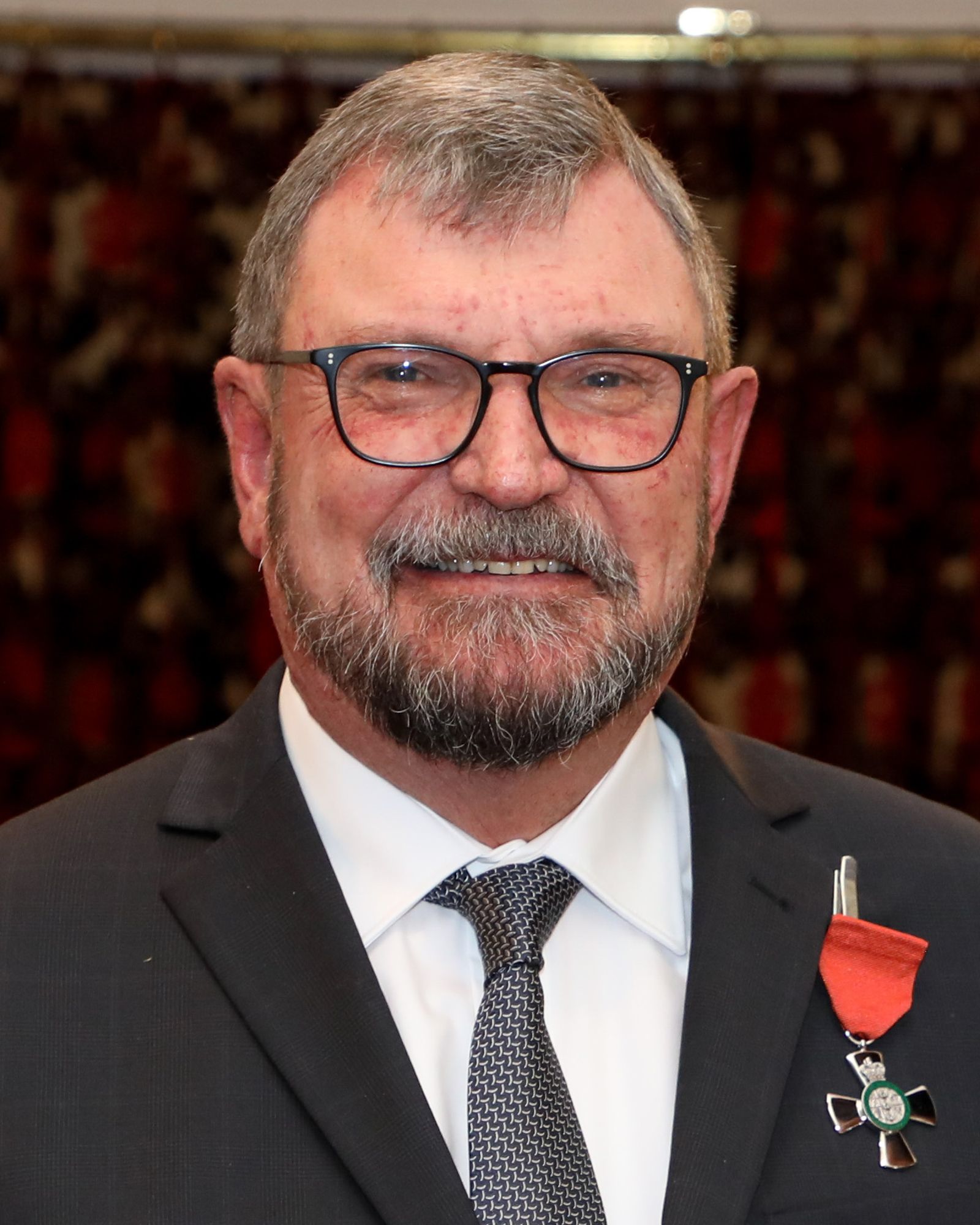
Charles Wilkinson

== Royal Victorian Order ==
=== Commander (CVO) ===
- Michael Lindo Charles Webster – lately secretary of the Cabinet and clerk of the Executive Council.
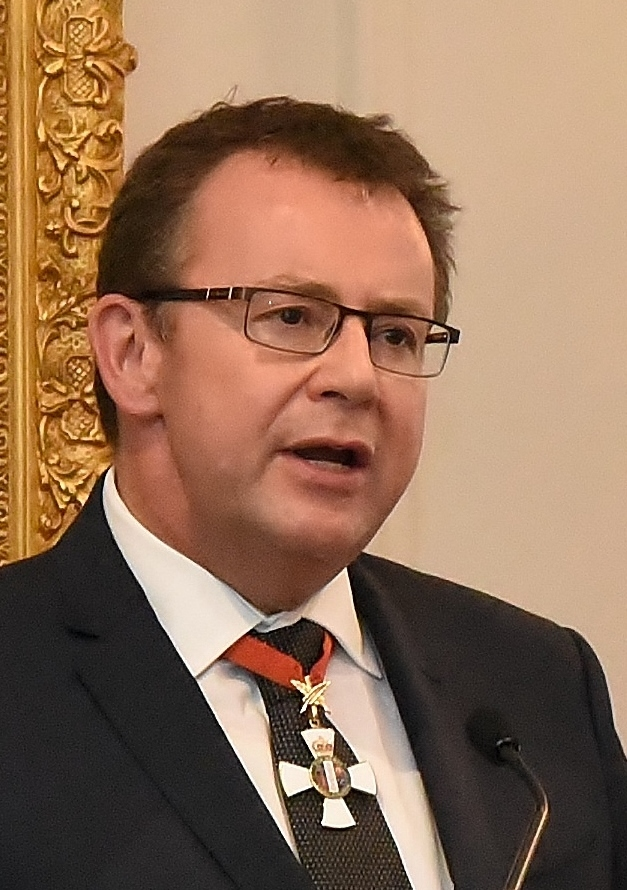
Michael Webster

== Companion of the Queen's Service Order (QSO) ==
- John Robert Dobson – of Fairfield. For services to people with disabilities.
- Dr Caroline Ann McElnay – of Napier. For services to public health.
- Kura Te Rangi Moeahu – of Lower Hutt. For services to Māori and the arts.
- Hayden Paul Waretini Wano – of New Plymouth. For services to Māori health
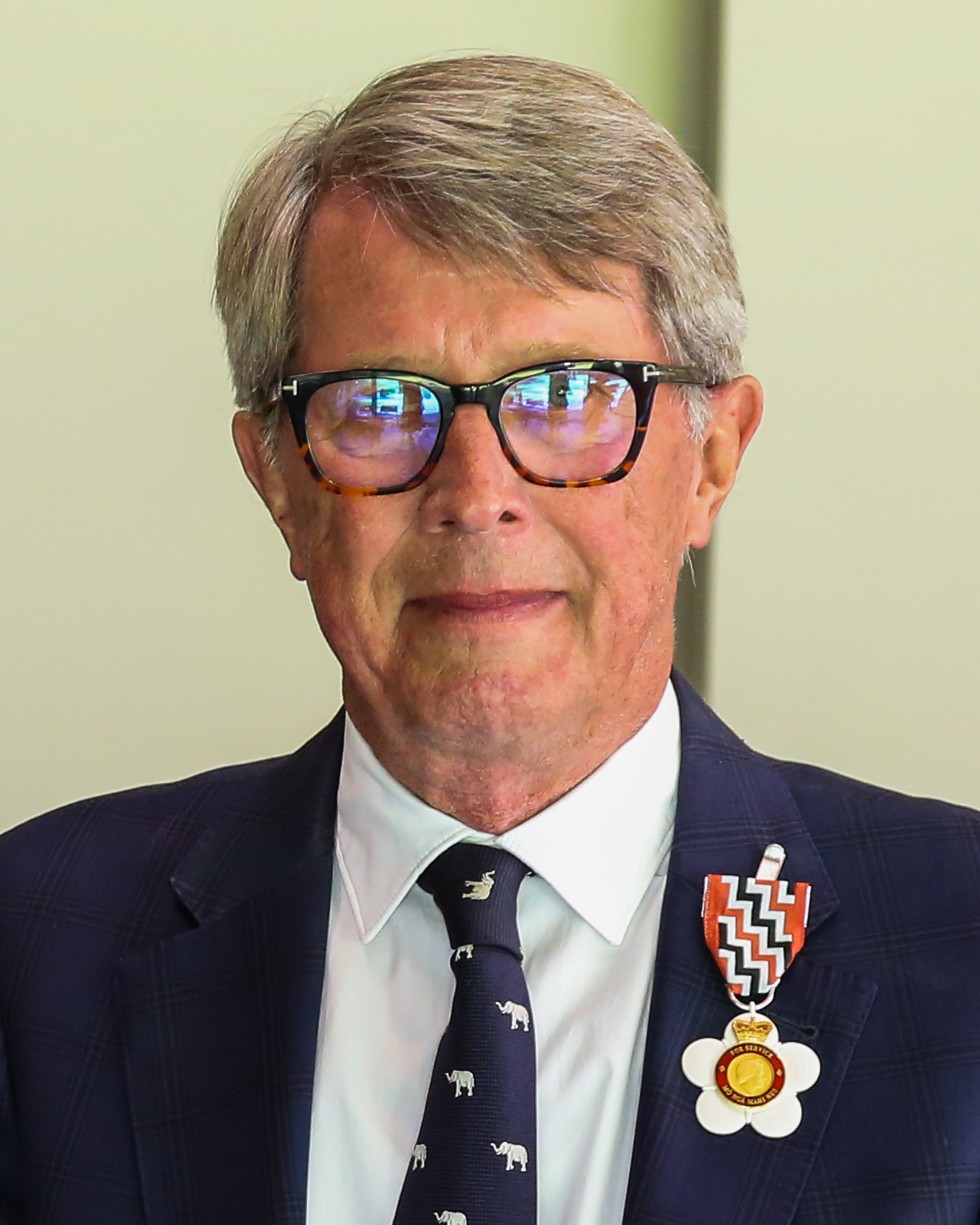
John Dobson

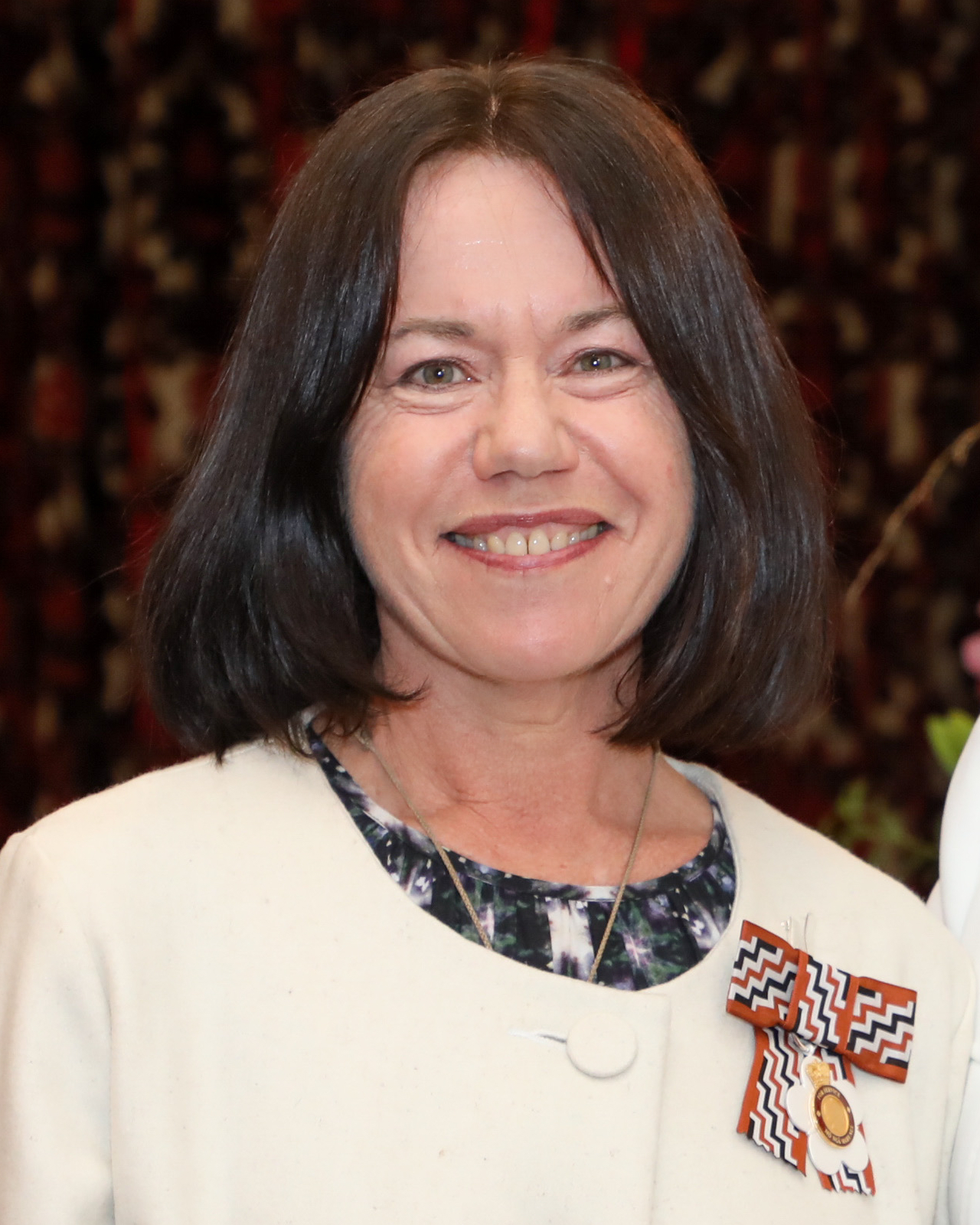
Caroline McElnay

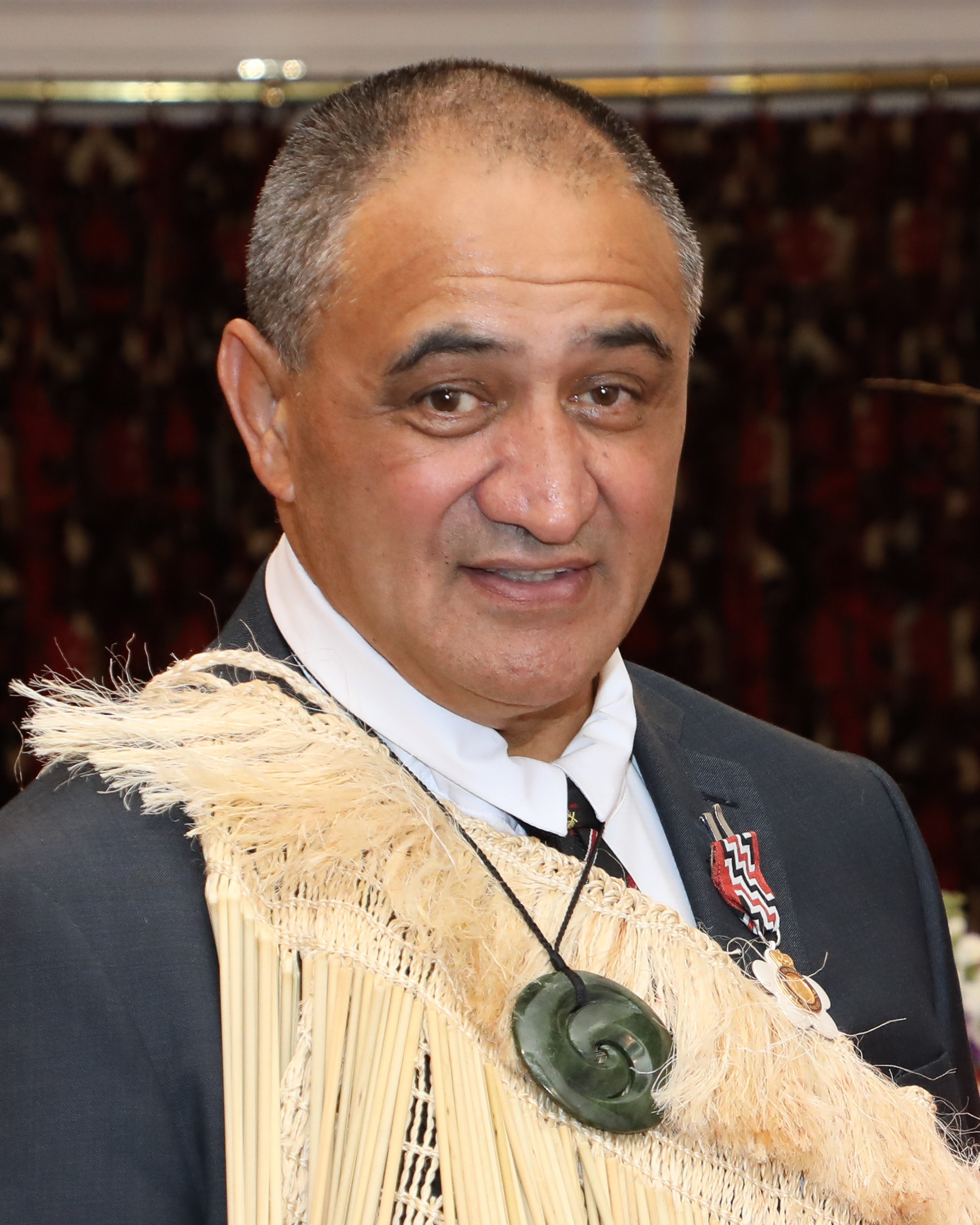
Kura Moeahu

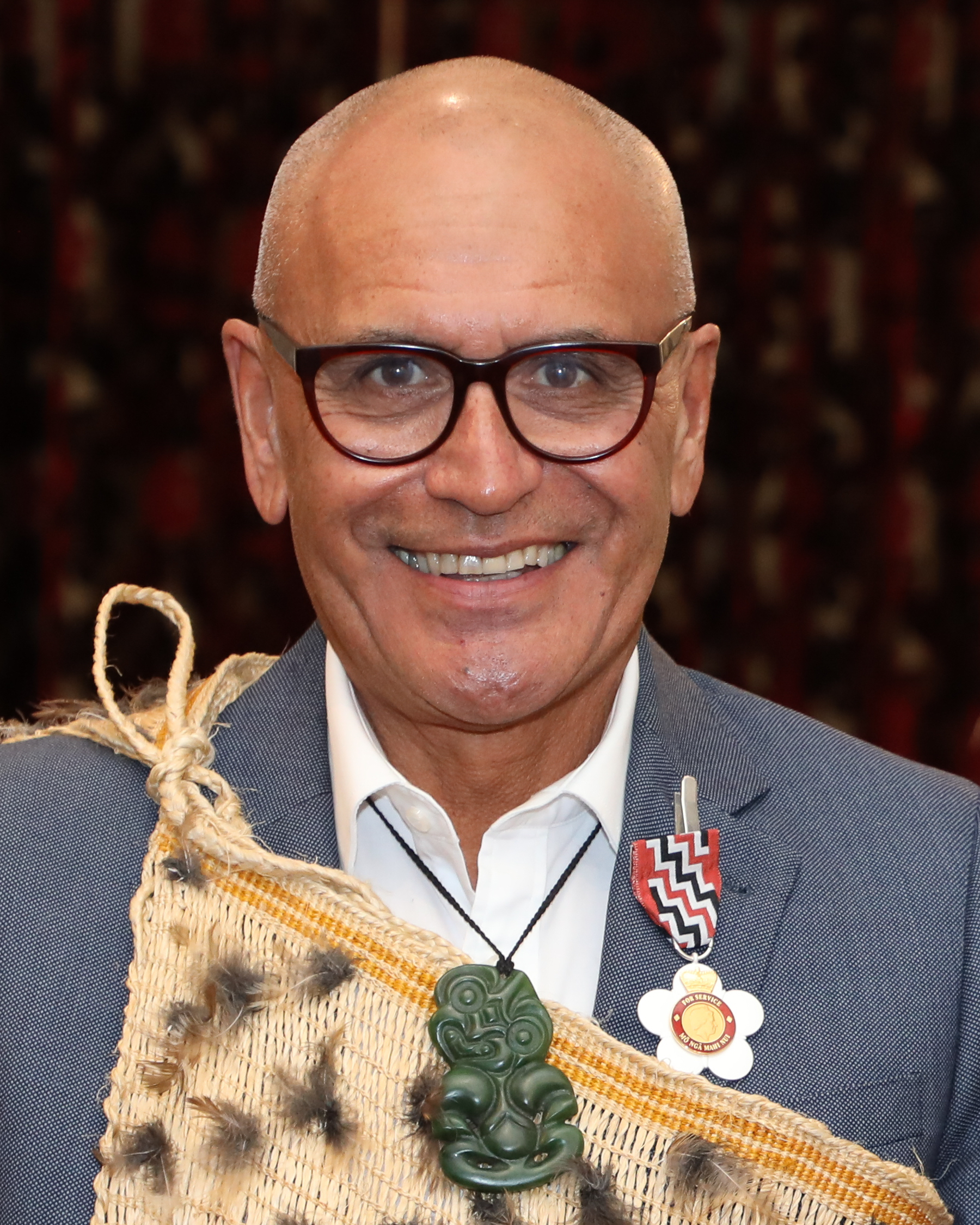
Hayden Wano

== Queen's Service Medal (QSM) ==
- Naomi Ruth Baker-Wenley – of Havelock North. For services to opera.
- Margaret Anne Bourke – of Masterton. For services to the community.
- Rodger Henry Brickland – of Auckland. For services to athletics.
- Brendan Sean Butler – of Waipawa. For services to Fire and Emergency New Zealand.
- Geoffrey Denis Clews – of Auckland. For services to the arts and the community.
- Maurice James Cowie – of Omarama. For services to Search and Rescue.
- Trevor Michael Crosbie JP – of Ngāruawāhia. For services to Fire and Emergency New Zealand.
- Rosemary Jane Ensor – of Hanmer Springs. For services to the community.
- Kinaua Bauriri Ewels – of Auckland. For services to the Kiribati community.
- Lynore Ann Farry – of Dunedin. For services to the community.
- George Rafton Flavell – of Waiuku. For services to Māori culture and heritage preservation.
- Matthew Vincent Frost – of Wellington. For services to people with autism.
- Galumalemana Fetaiaimauso Marion Galumalemana – of Auckland. For services to the Pacific community.
- James William Gordon – of Hokitika. For services to the community.
- Hana Melania Halalele – of Oamaru. For services to Pacific health.
- Clyde Harris Hamilton – of Waiuku. For services to the community and heritage preservation.
- Afife Skafi Harris – of Dunedin. For services to migrant communities.
- Eileen Margaret Jean Harvey-Thawley – of Māpua. For services to Fire and Emergency New Zealand and the community.
- James Richard Strachan Higham – of Dunedin. For services to rugby and education.
- Barbara Noeline Jeffries – of Hamilton. For services to equestrian sport and war commemoration.
- Judith Ann Johnson JP – of Timaru. For services as a justice of the peace.
- Teurukura Tia Kekena – of Porirua. For services to the Cook Islands and Pacific communities.
- Carol Anne Martin – of Hokitika. For services to the community and netball.
- Kevin James McComb – of Whakatāne. For services to cycling.
- Agnes (Nancy) McCulloch McShane – of Christchurch. For services to women and pay equity.
- Karen Anne Morris – of Cambridge. For services to the community.
- Kenneth Michael Morris – of Cambridge. For services to the community.
- Nanai Pati Muaau – of Lower Hutt. For services to Pacific health.
- Euon Graham Murrell JP – of Porirua. For services to the community.
- The Reverend Woo Taek Nam – of Silverdale. For services to the Korean community.
- Lomia Kaipati Semaia Naniseni – of Auckland. For services to the Tokelau community.
- James Allan Ngarewa JP – of Pātea. For services to the community and education.
- Gavin Russell Alan Nicol – of Ōpōtiki. For services to veterans.
- Yong Rahn Park – of Auckland. For services to the Korean community.
- Linda Susan Rutland – of Christchurch. For services to the community.
- Ma’a Brian Sagala – of Auckland. For services to Pacific communities.
- Mamaitaloa Sagapolutele – of Rolleston. For services to education and the Pacific community.
- Ian Rankin Smith JP – of Te Karaka. For services to civil defence and the community.
- Patricia Isabel Smith – of Carterton. For services to the community.
- Donald Bruce Thomas – of Auckland. For services to the community and the legal profession.
- Muriel Patricia Tondi – of Mount Maunganui. For services to the Italian community and language education.
- Mavis Emlen Tweedie – of Havelock North. For services to the community.
- Kevin Victor Watkins – of Hastings. For services to the community and New Zealand–China relations.
- Helen Whittaker – of Whangārei. For services to art and the community.
- Robin Young – of Auckland. For services to the community.

Honorary

- Tofilau Nina Kirifi-Alai – of Auckland. For services to education and the Pacific community.
- Tuifa'asisina Kasileta Maria Lafaele – of Auckland. For services to Pacific health.
- Nemai Divuluki Vucago – of Auckland. For services to Fijian and Pacific communities.
- Kyo Jin Yun – of Christchurch. For services to the Korean community.
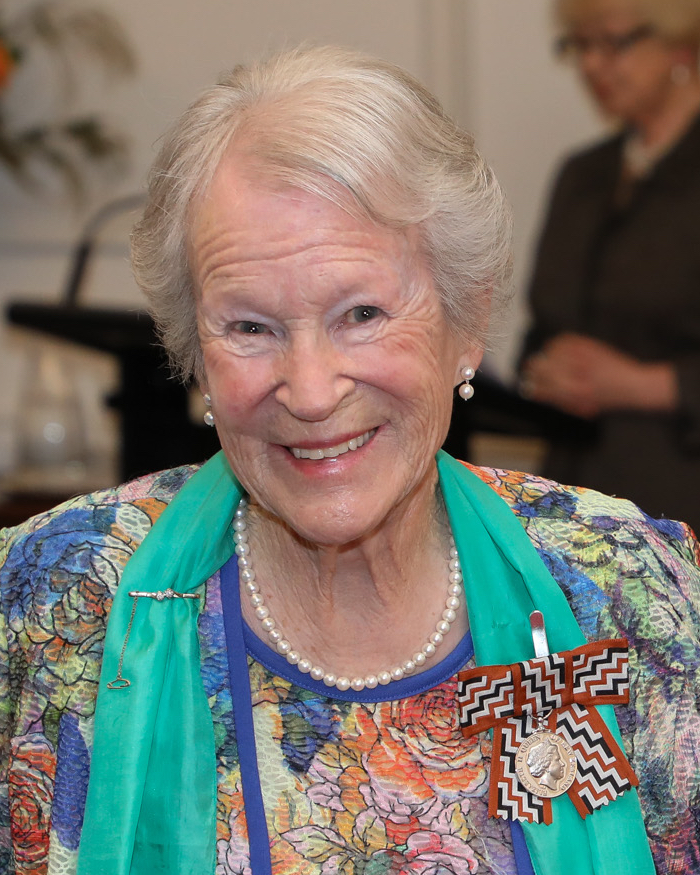
Naomi Baker‑Wenley

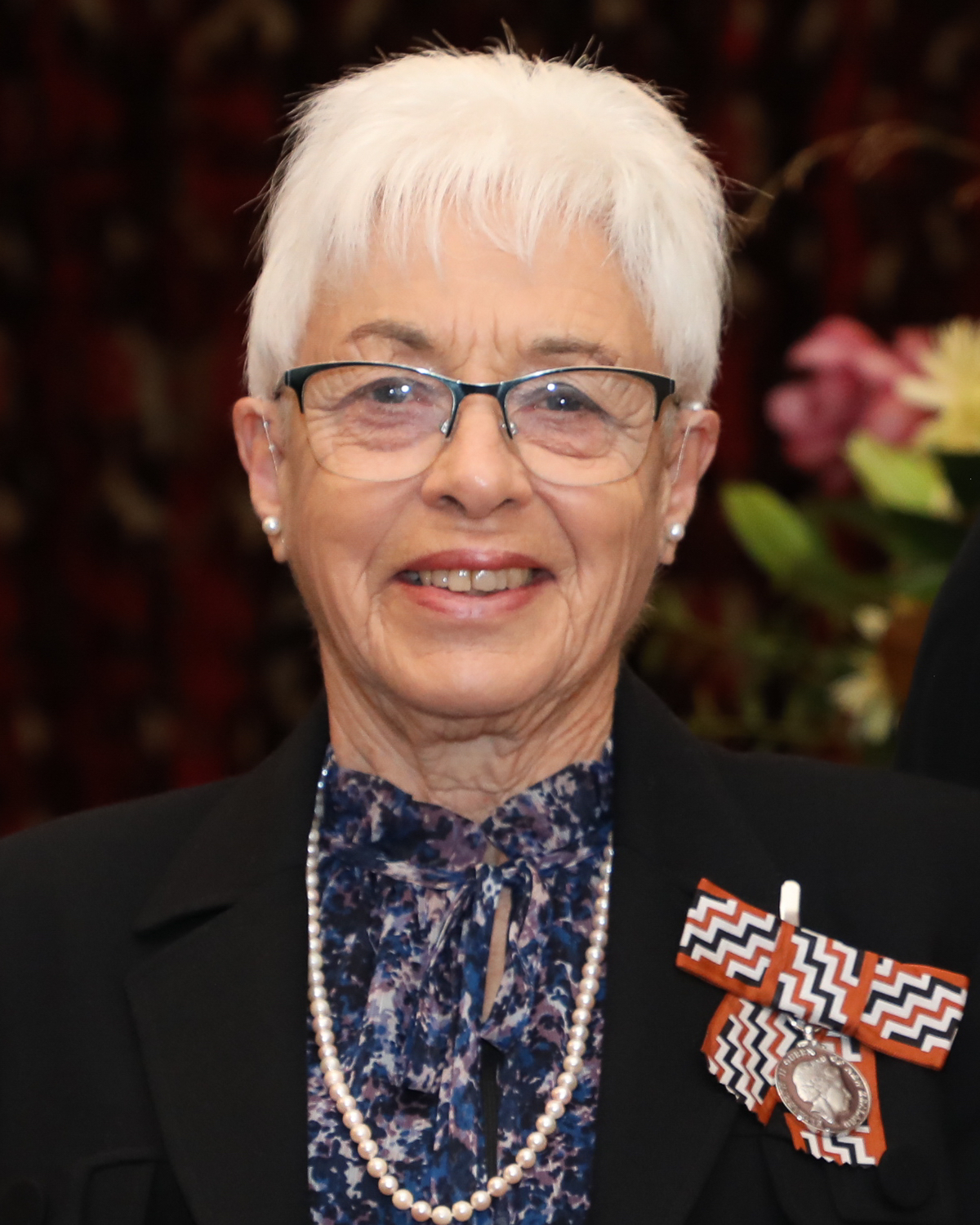
Margaret Bourke

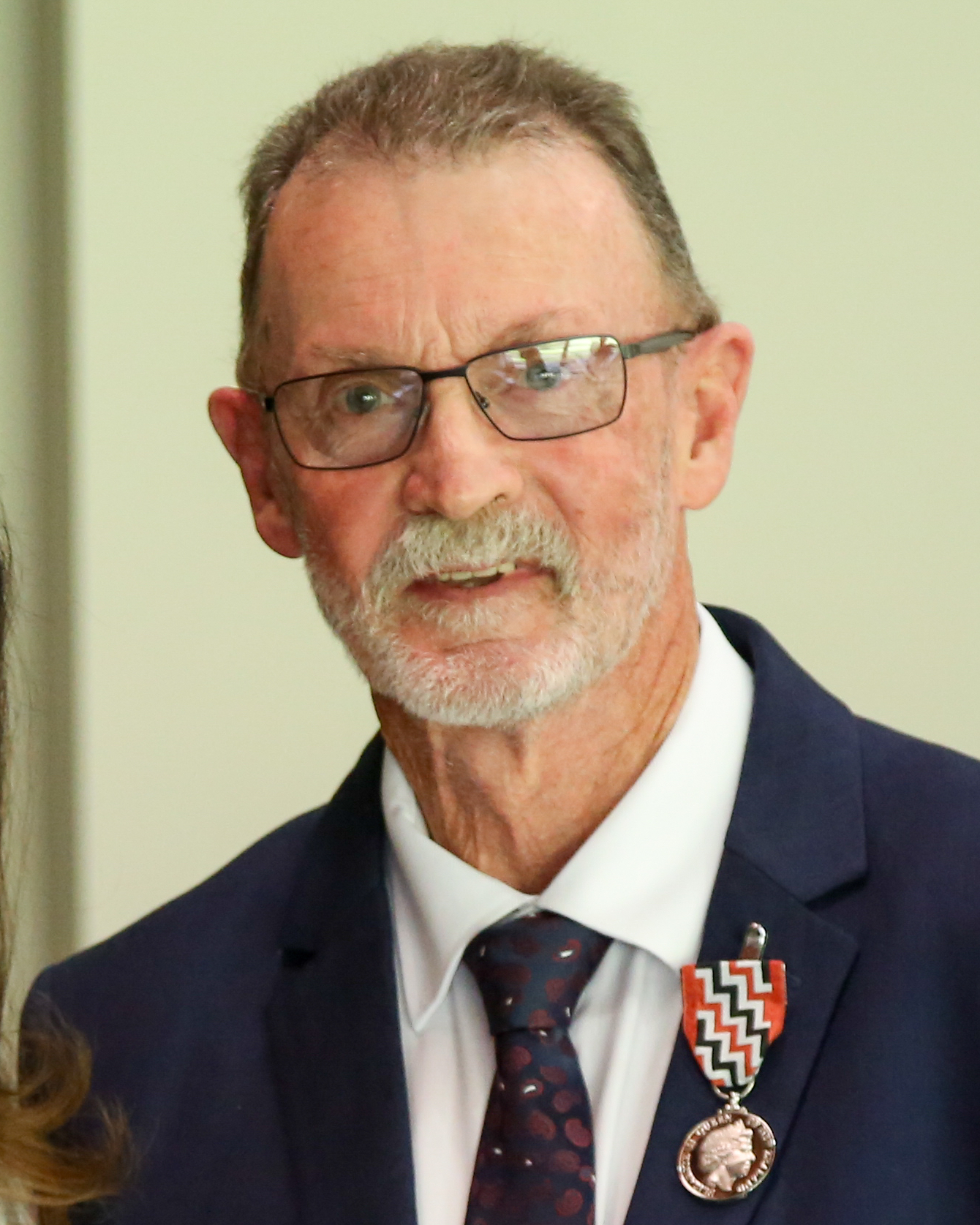
Rodger Brickland

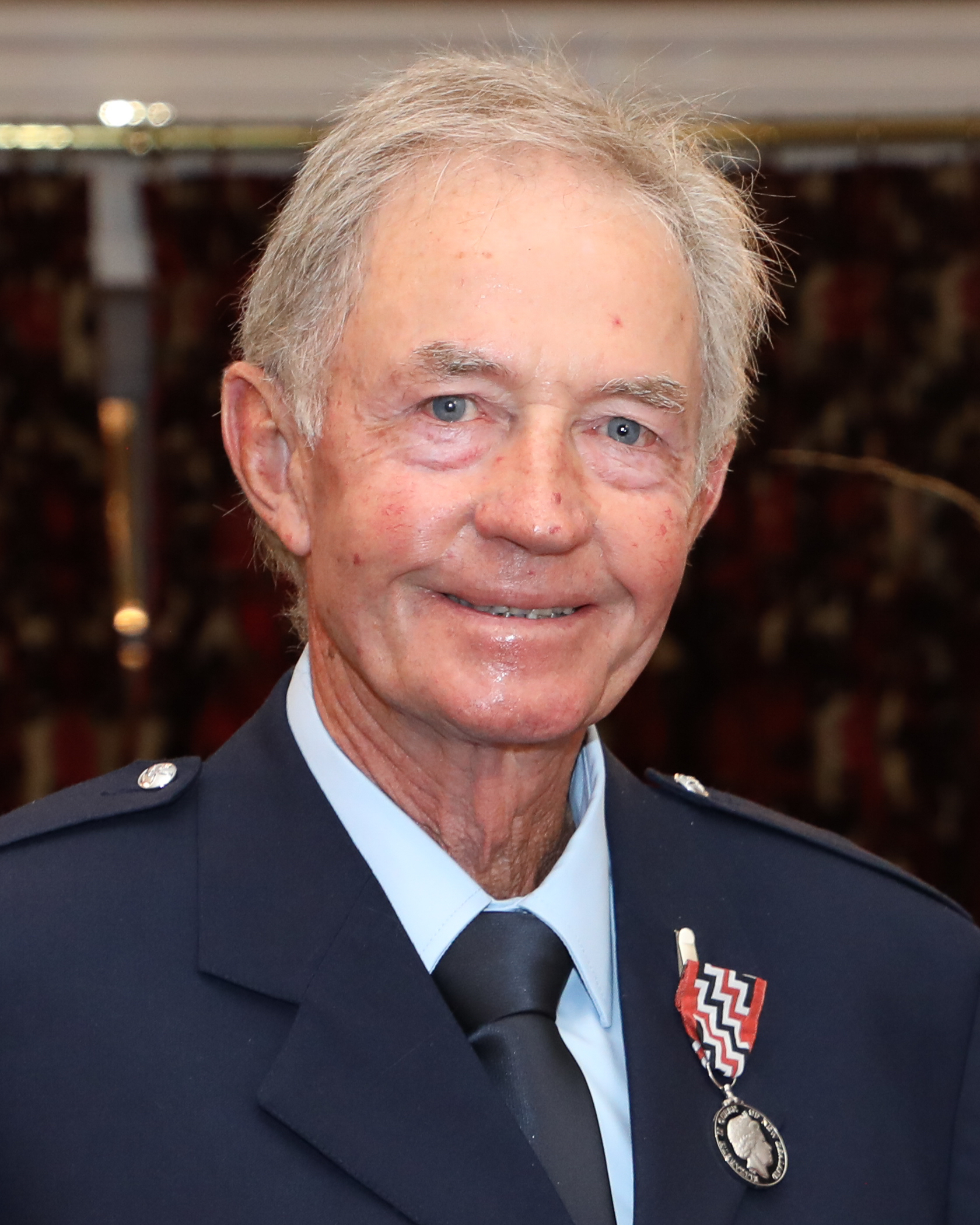
Brendan Butler

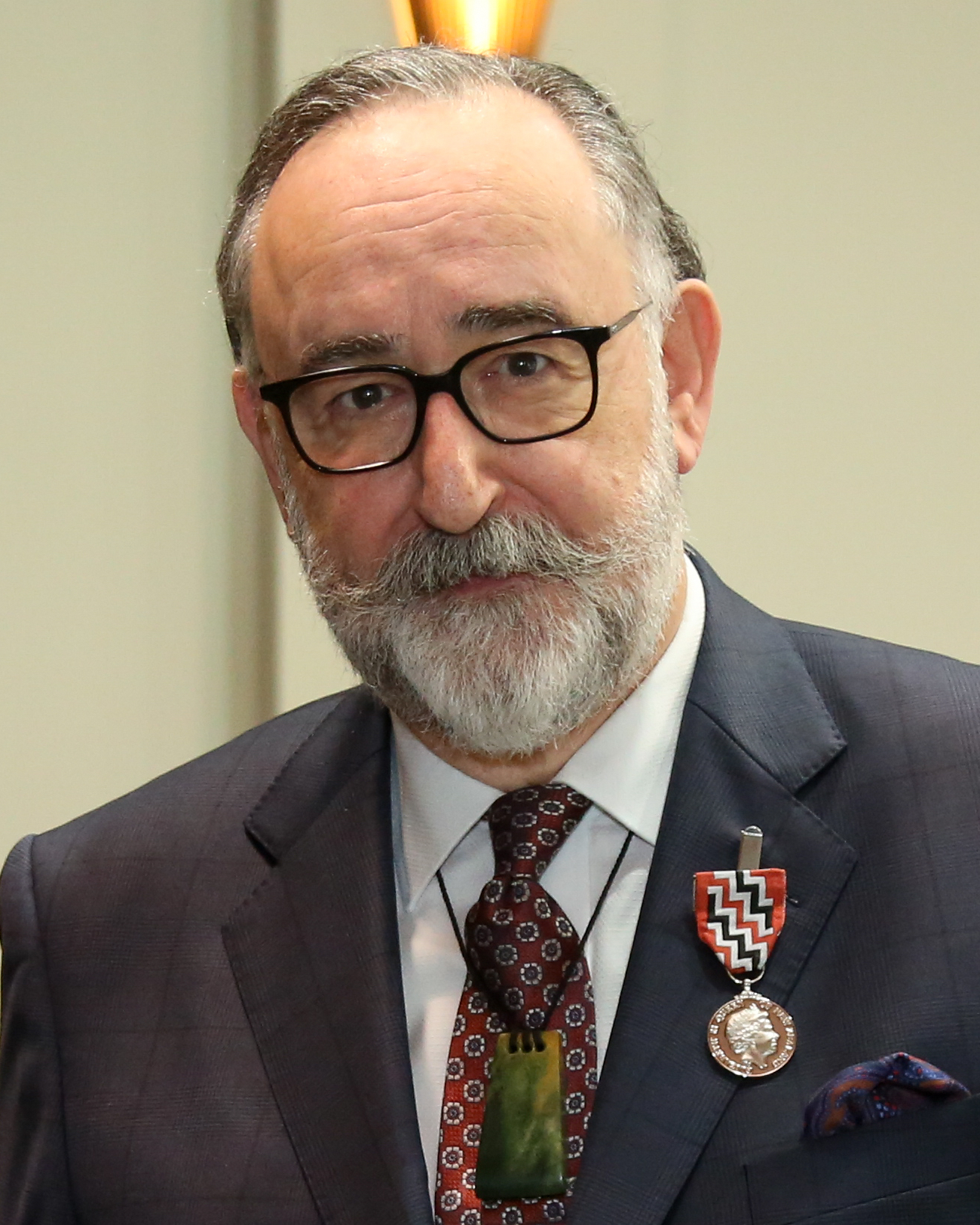
Geoffrey Clews

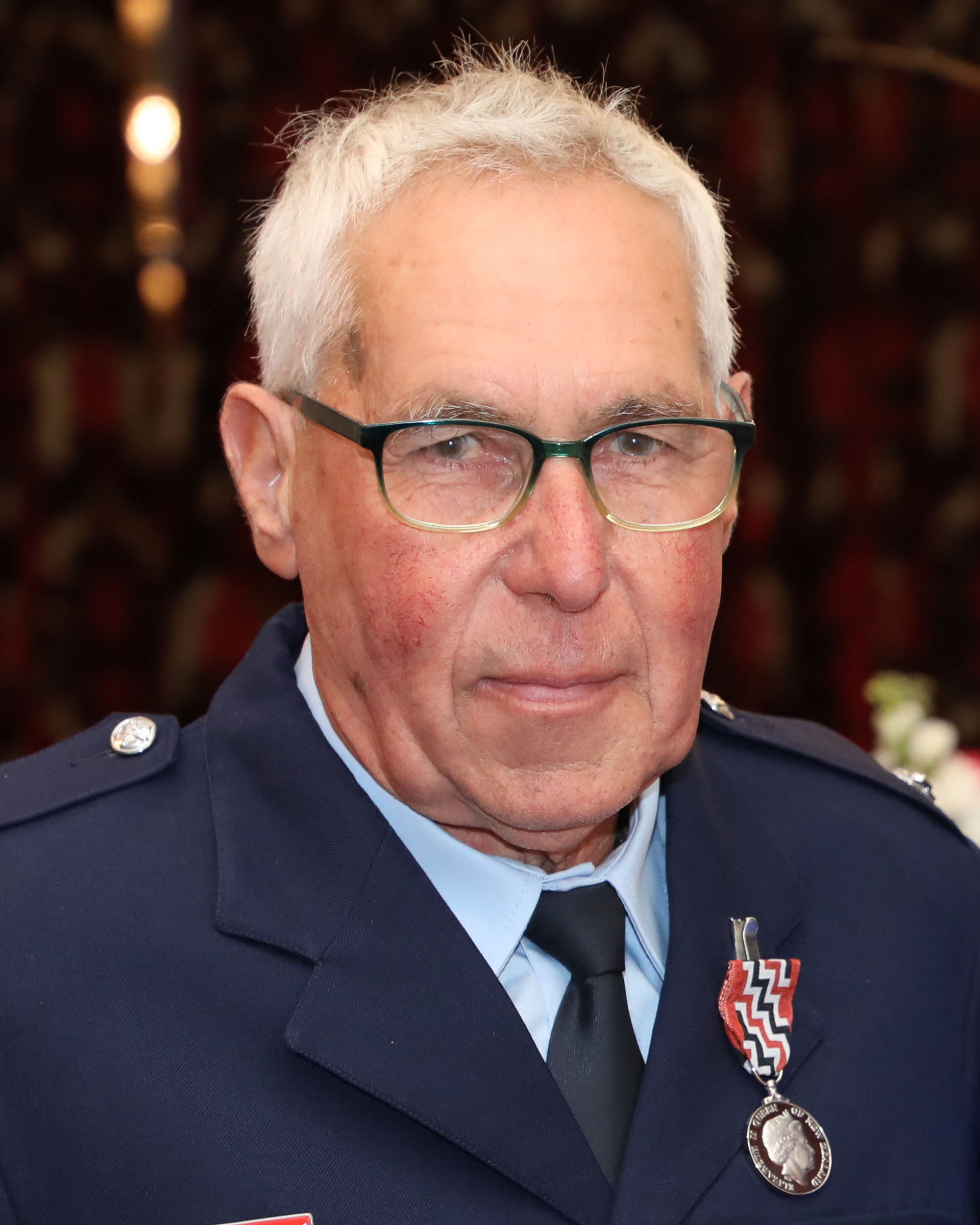
Maurice Cowie

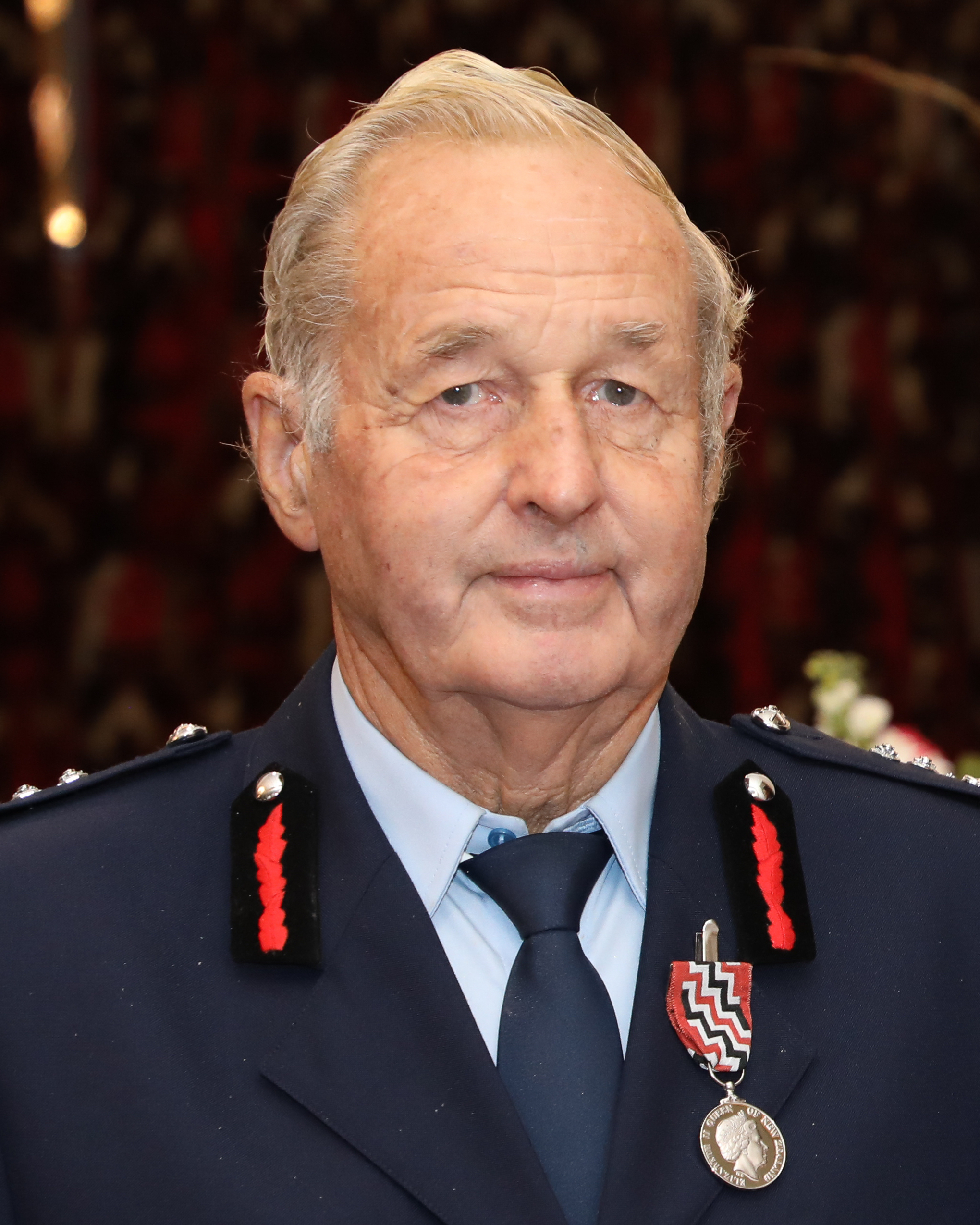
Mike Crosbie

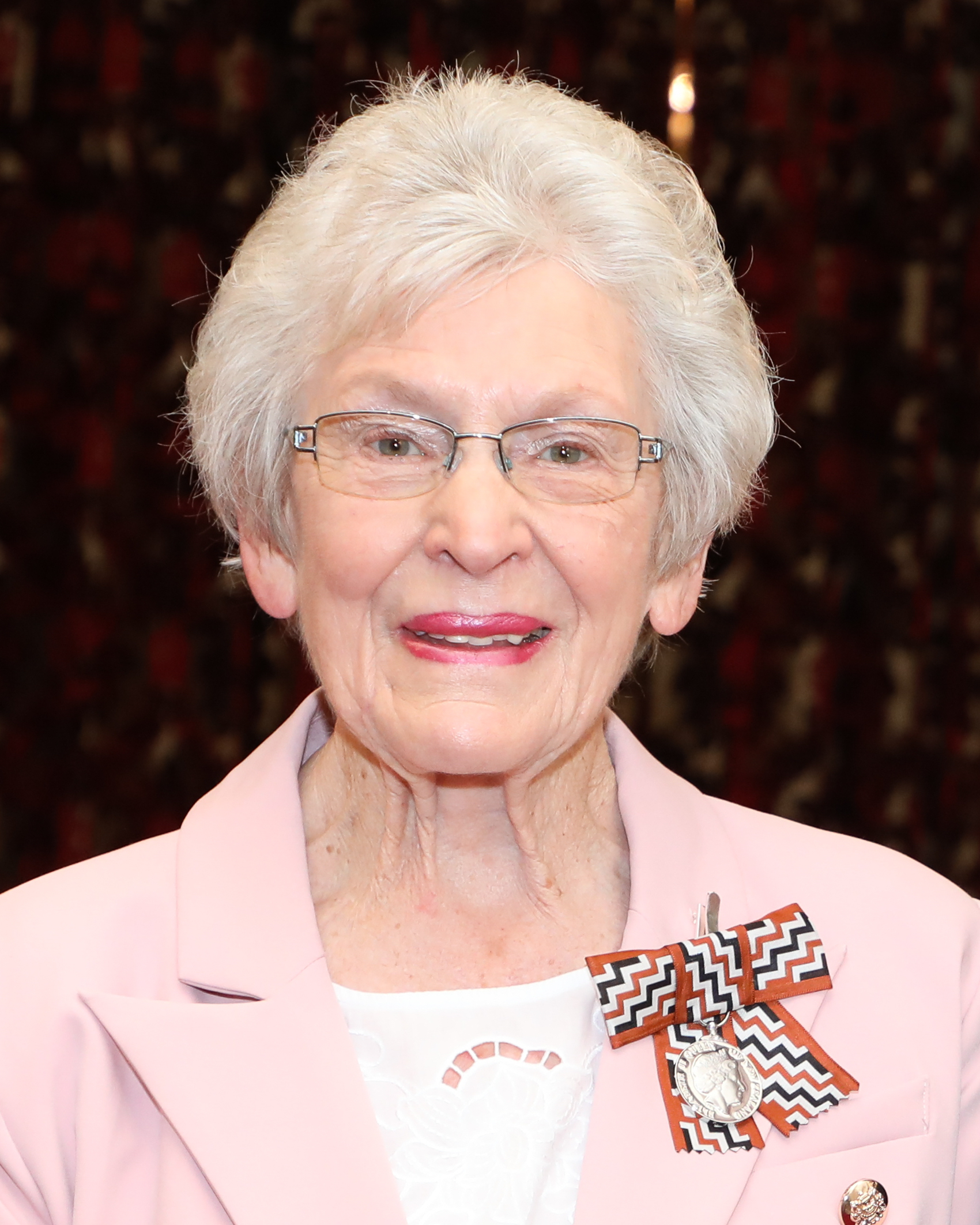
Rosemary Ensor

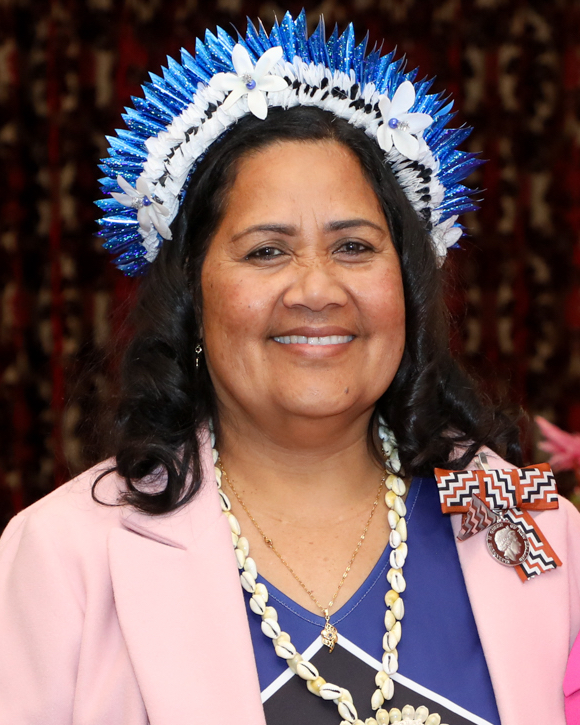
Kinaua Ewels

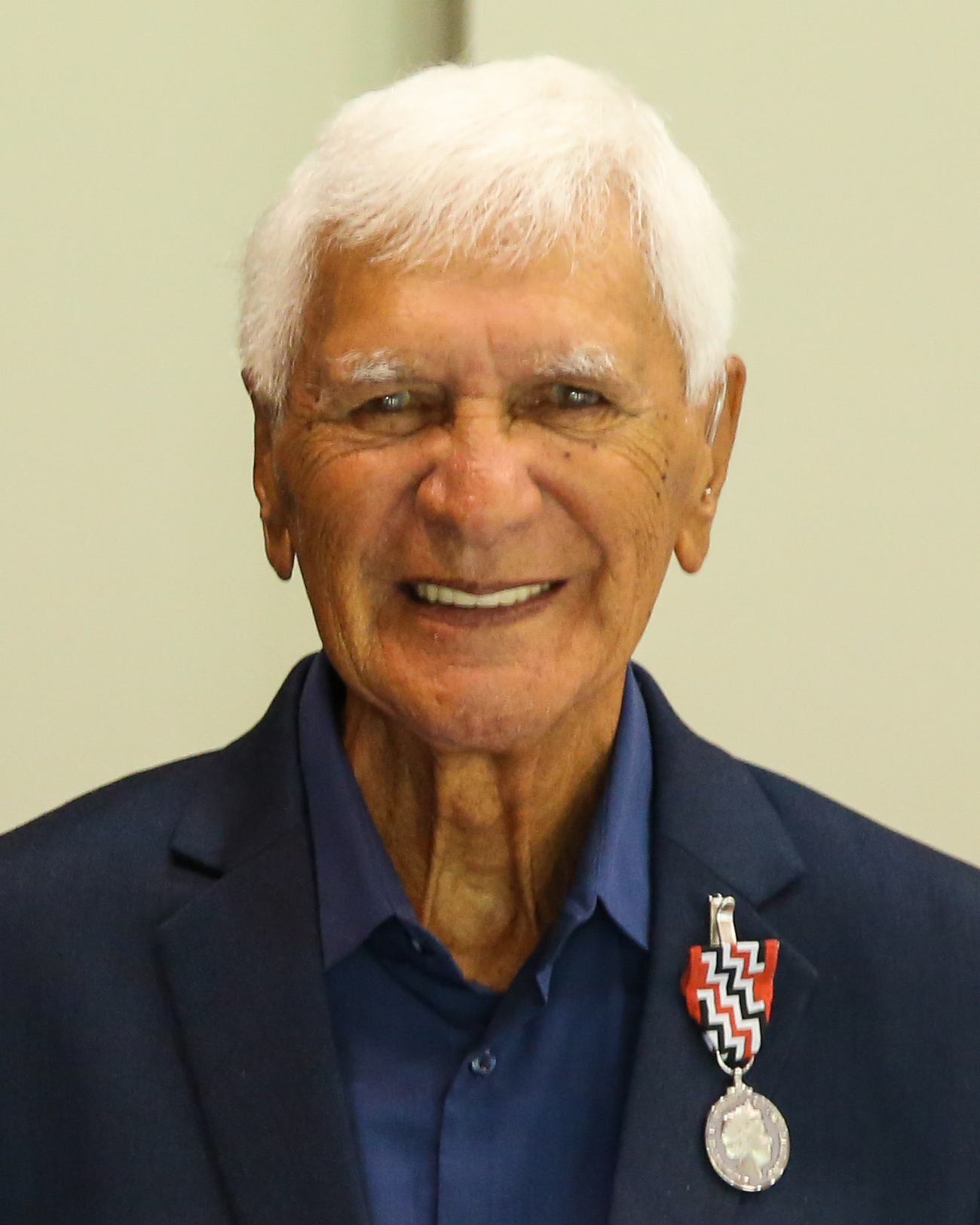
George Flavell

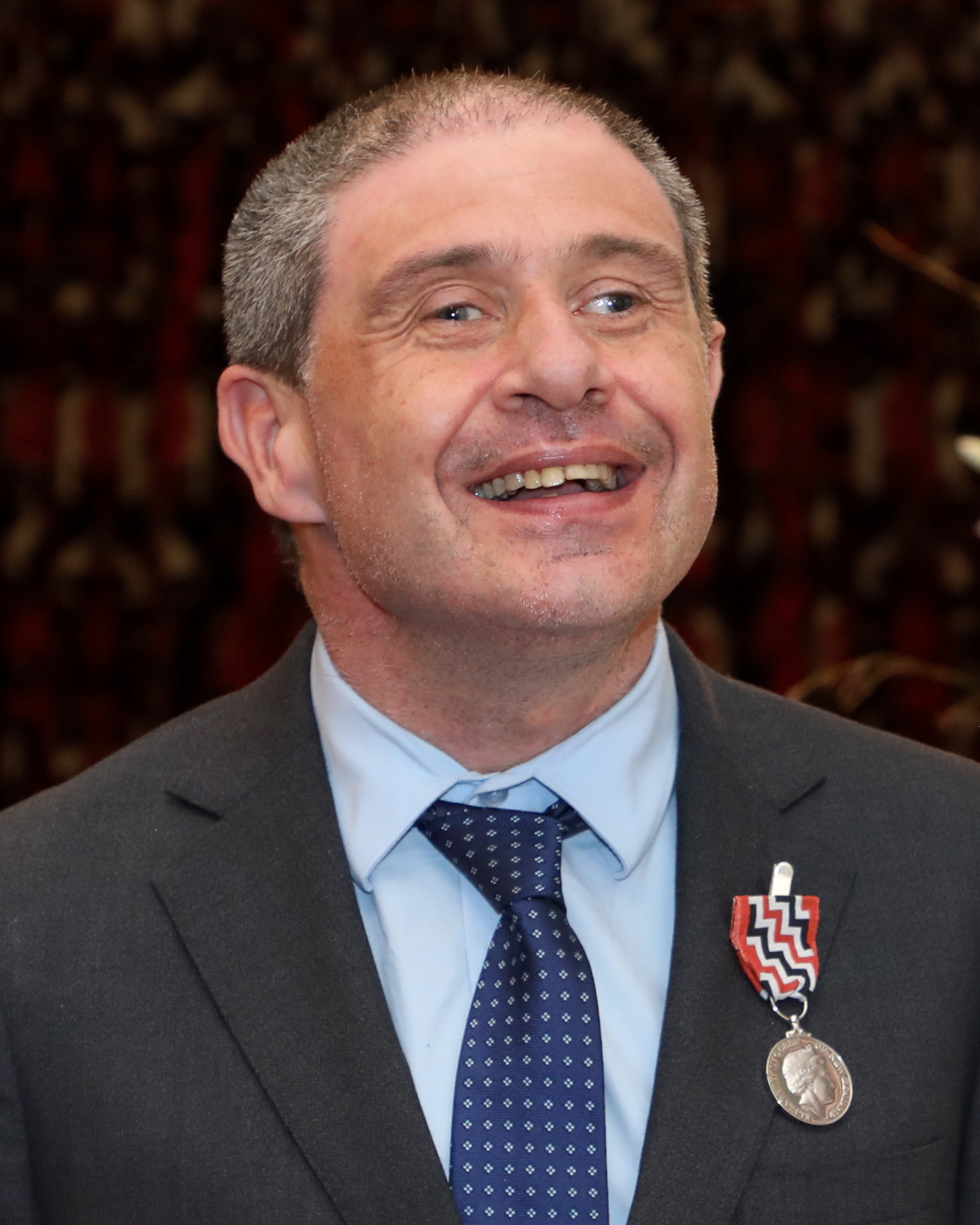
Matt Frost

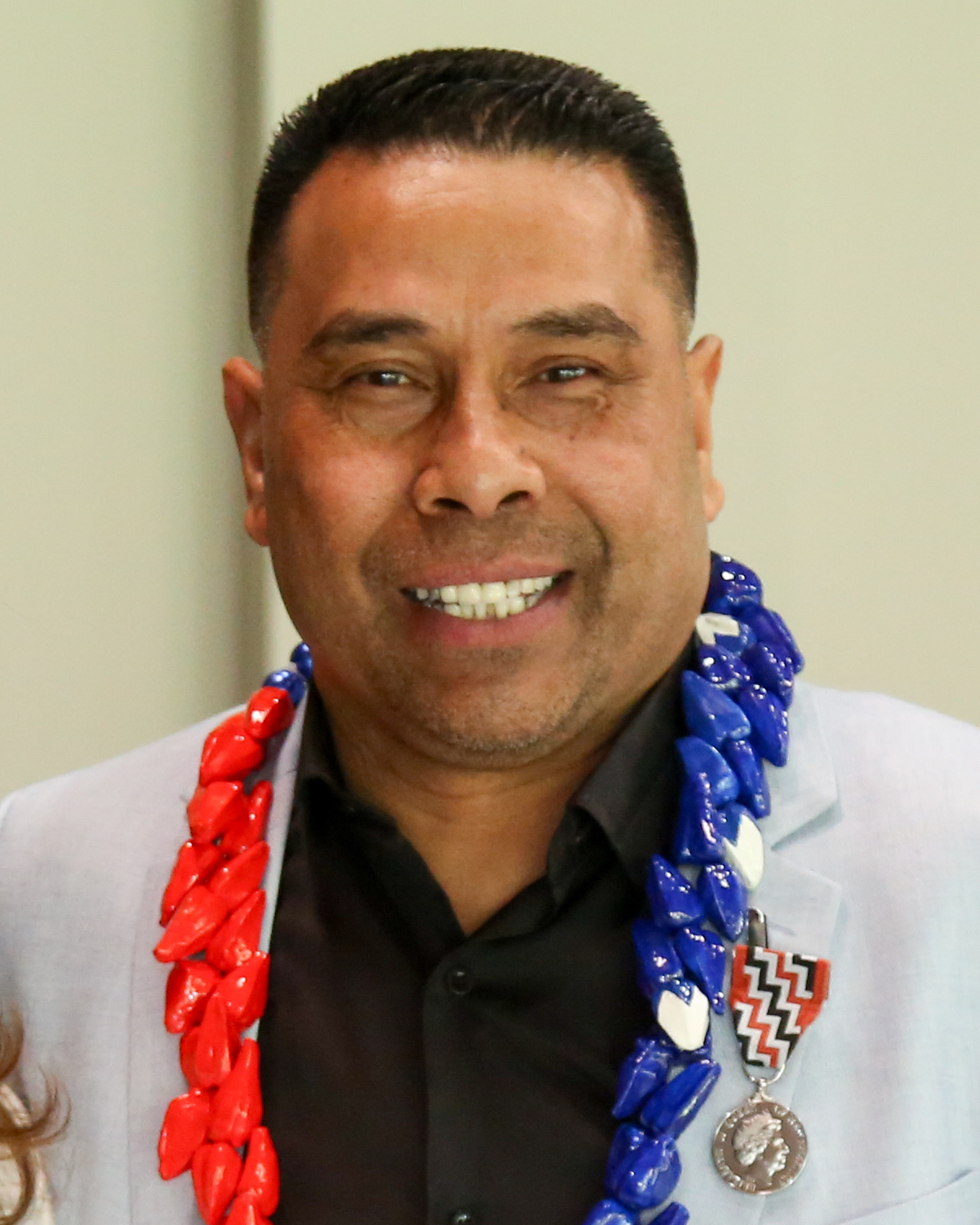
Galumalemana Galumalemana

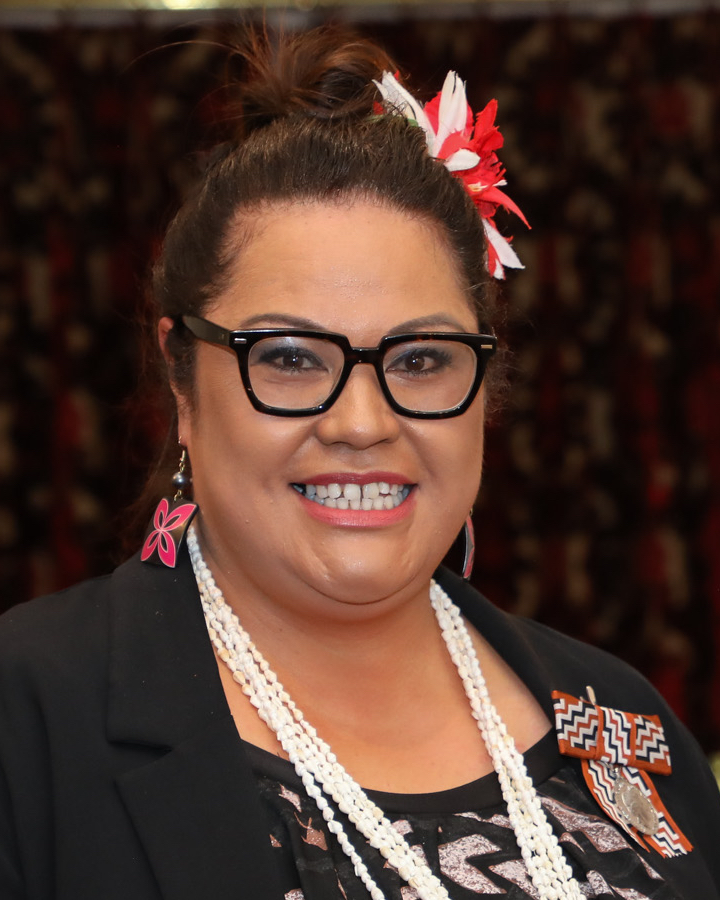
Hana Halalele

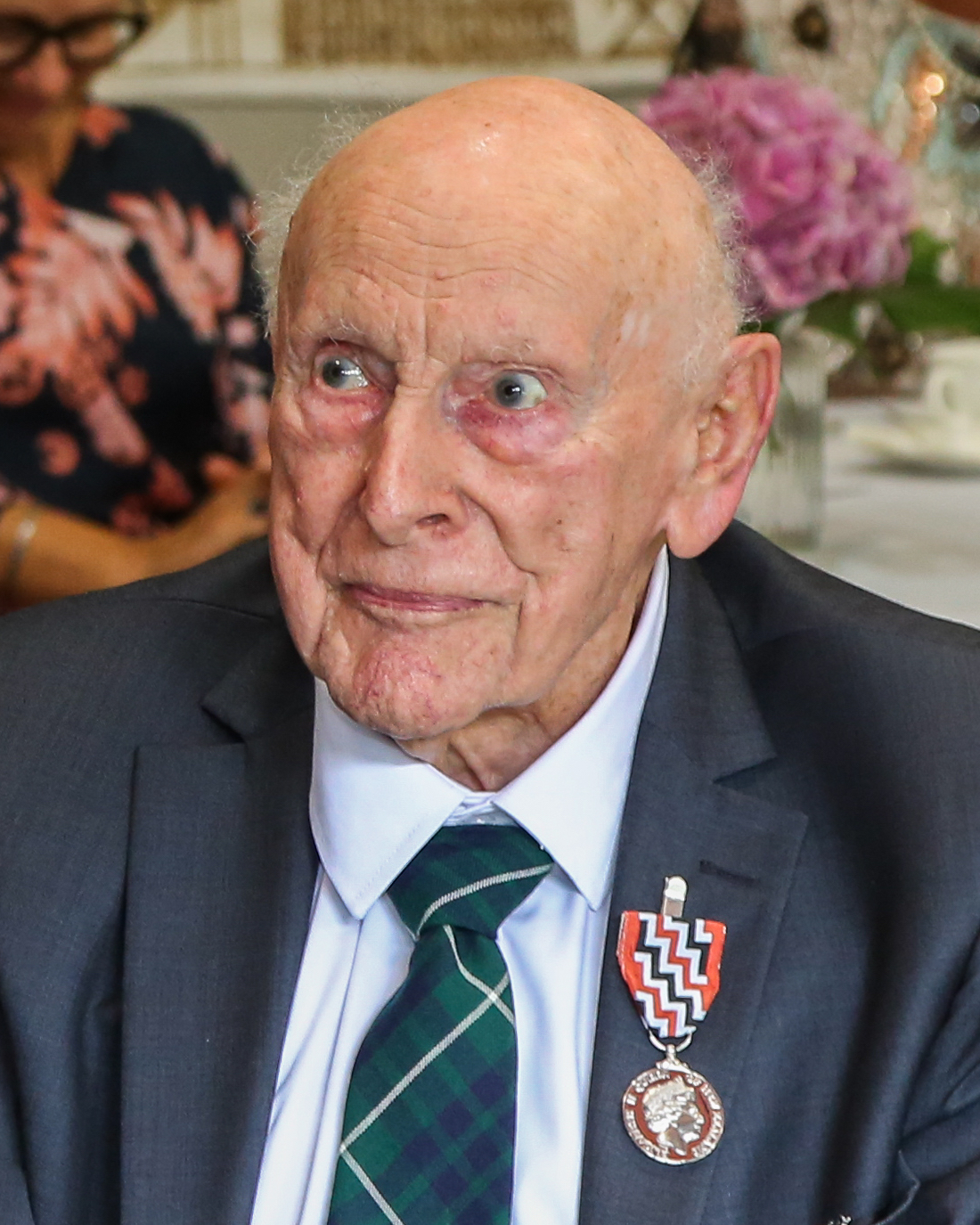
Clyde Hamilton

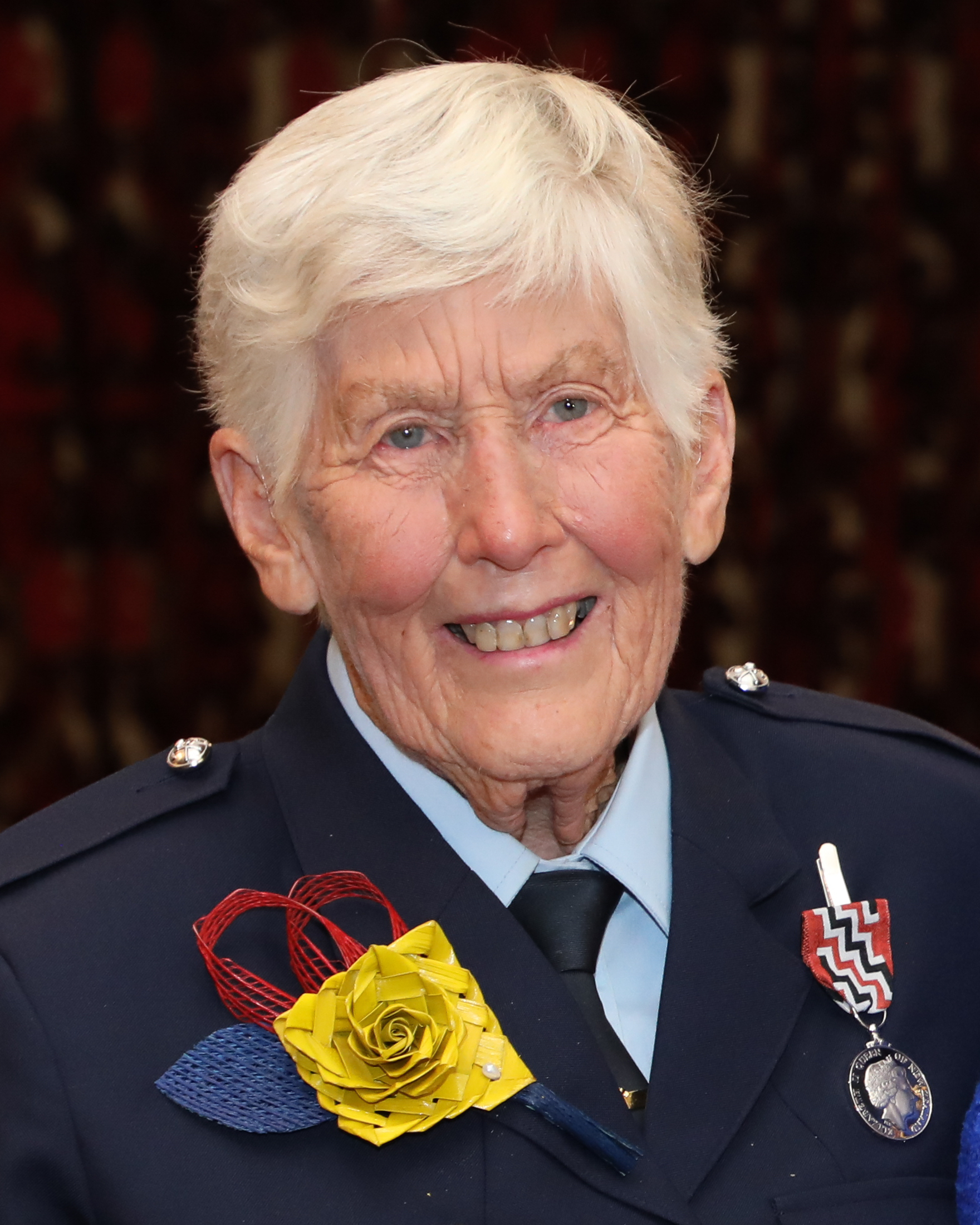
Eileen Harvey‑Thawley

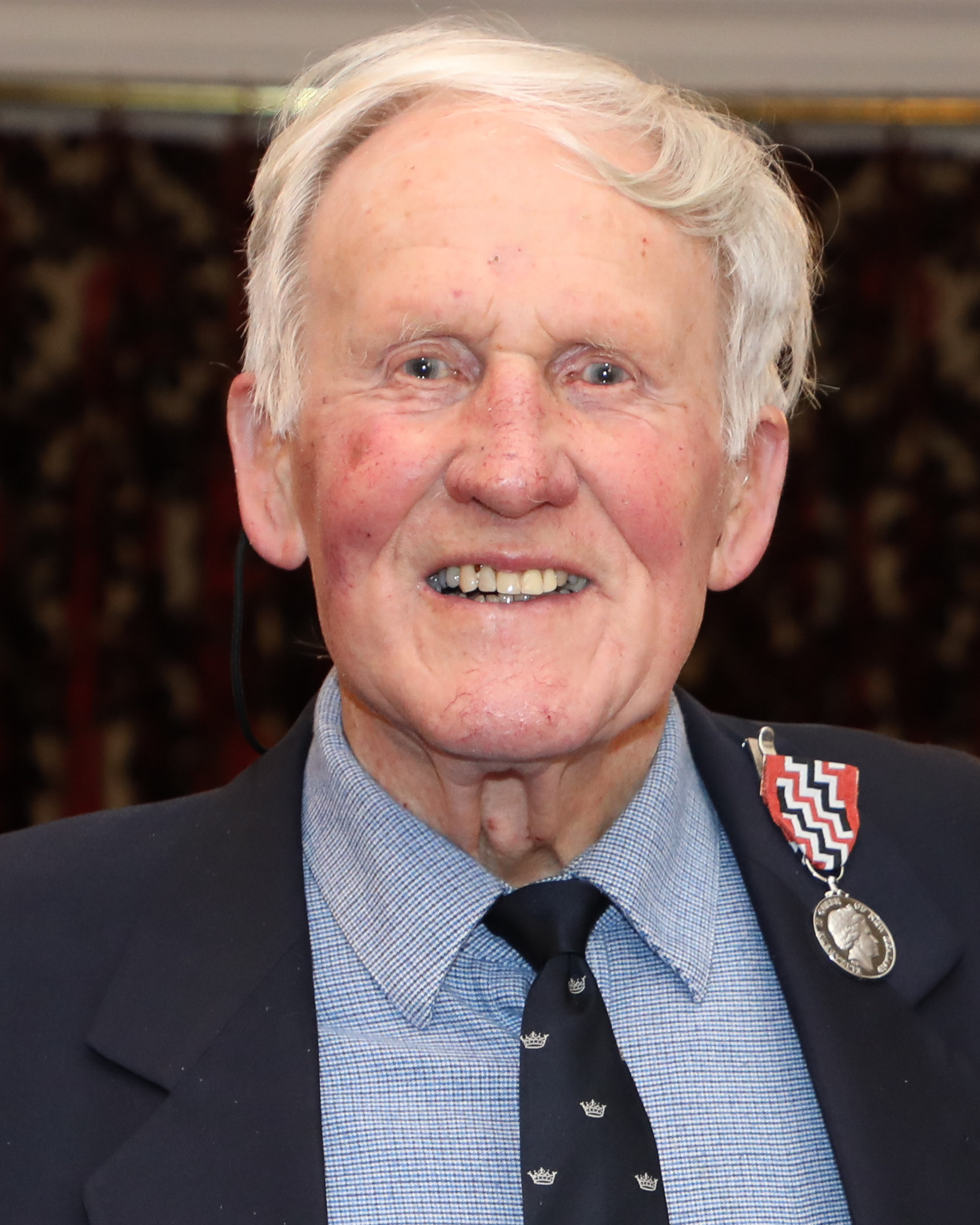
Richard Higham

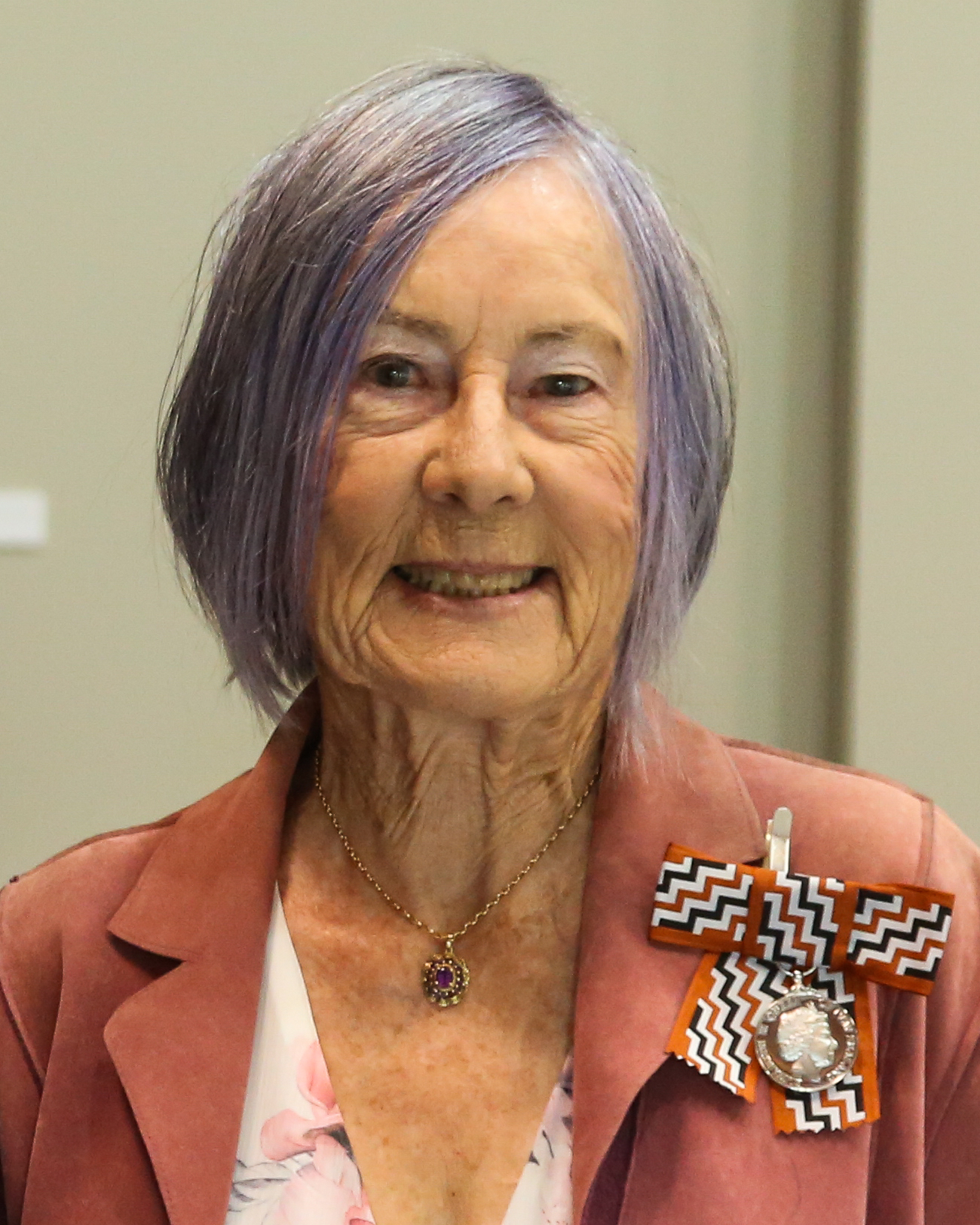
Noeline Jeffries

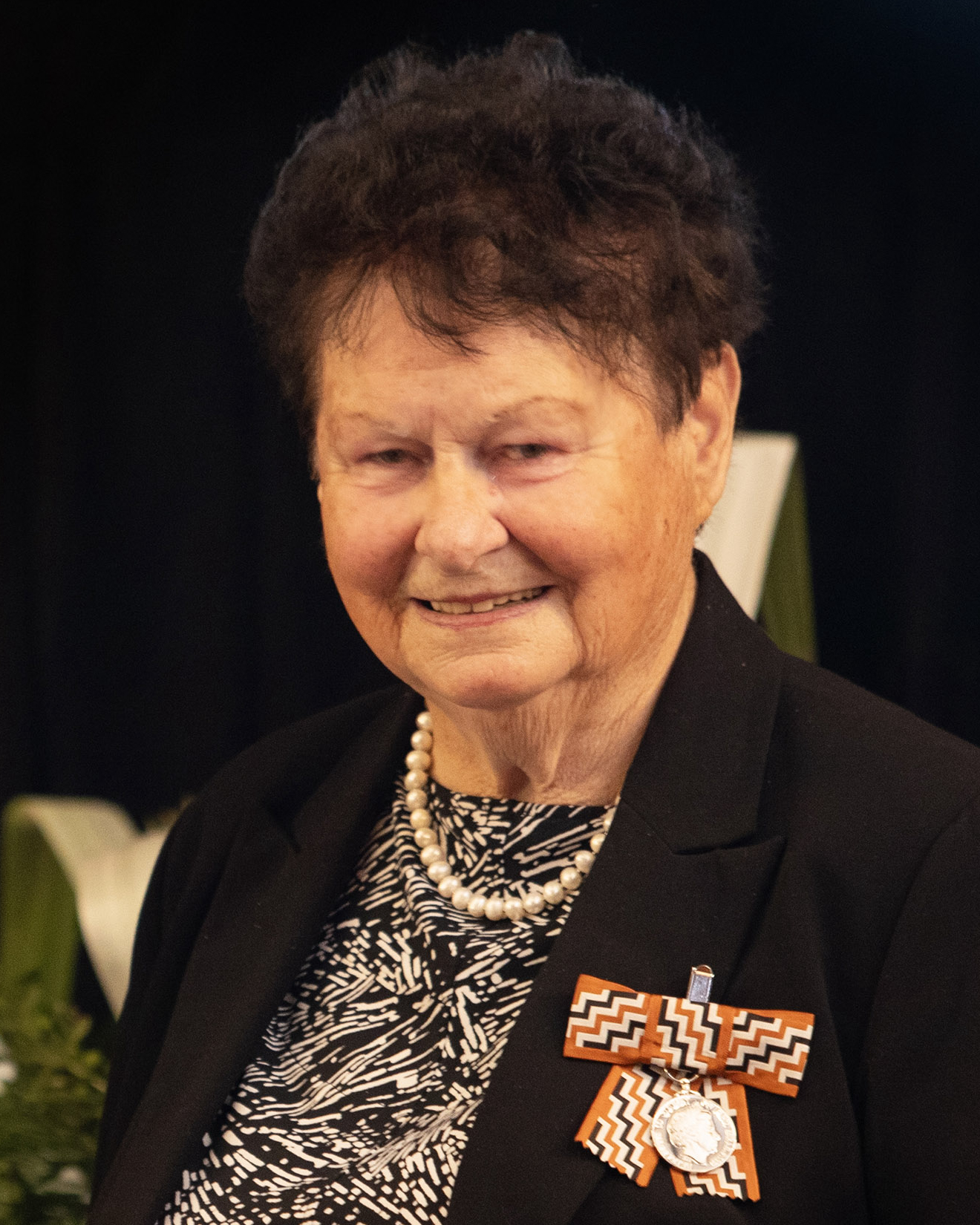
Judith Johnson

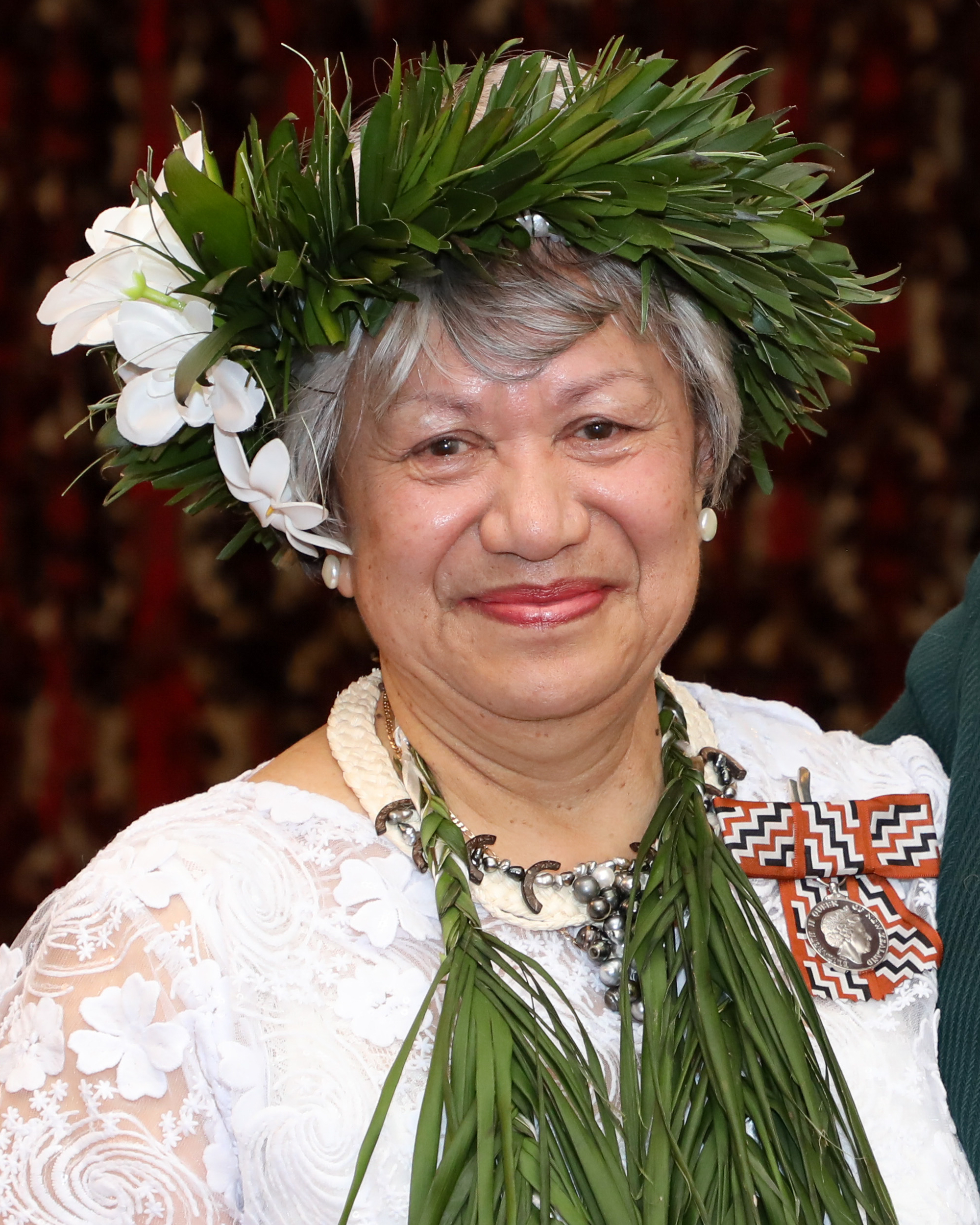
Teurukura Kekena

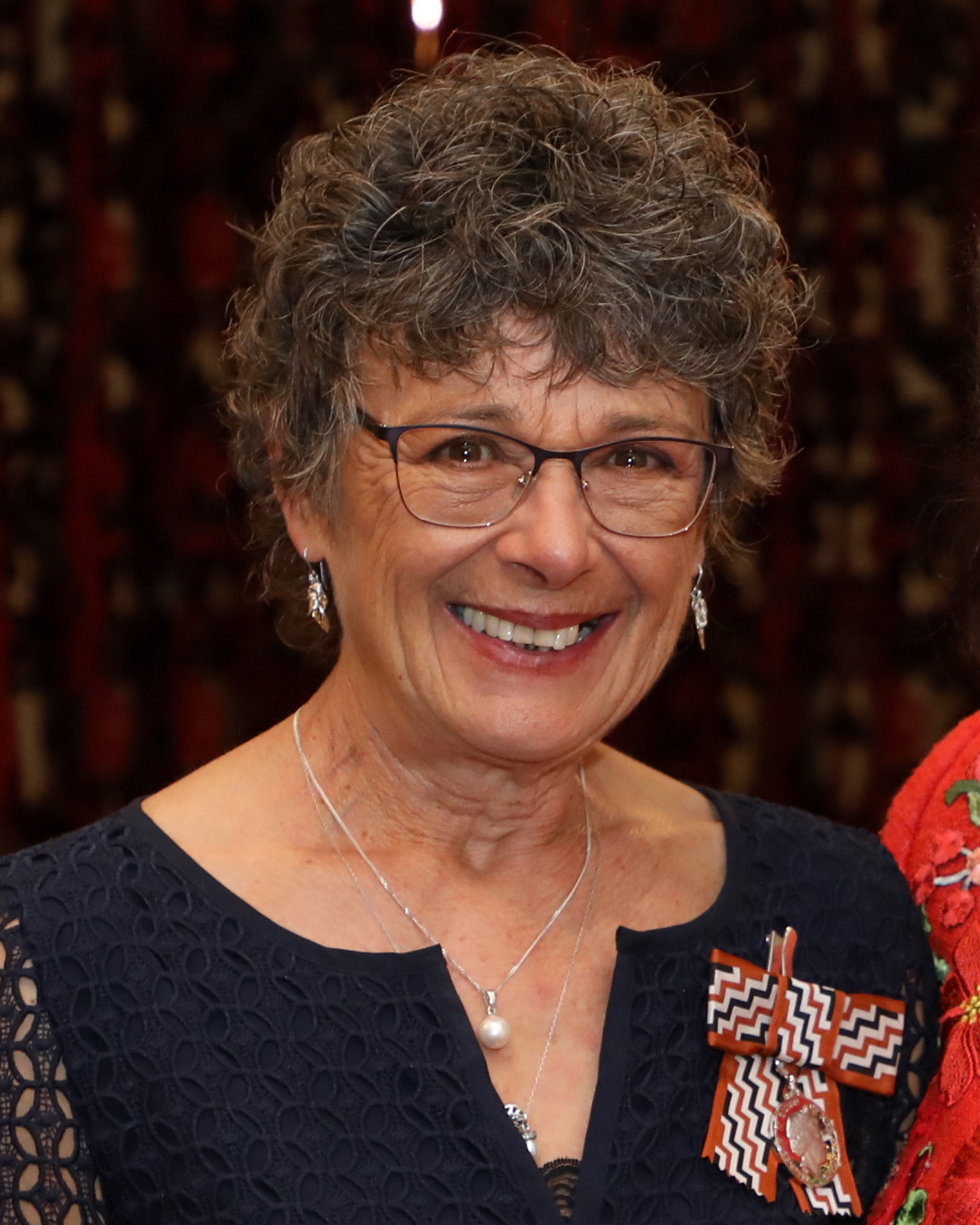
Carol Martin

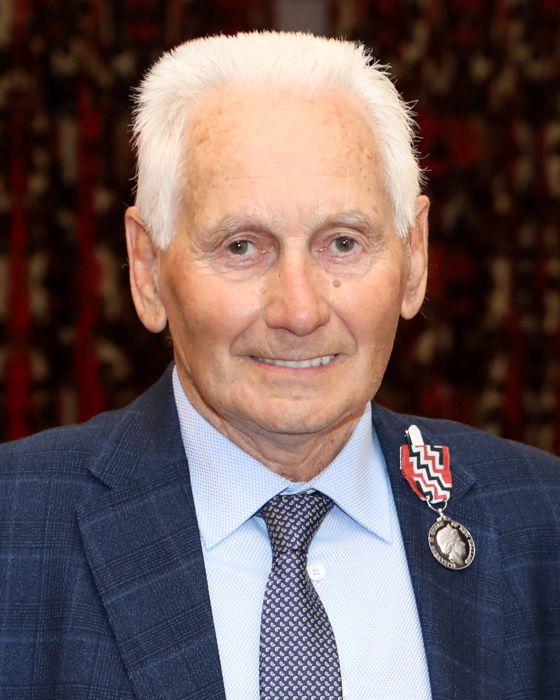
Kevin McComb

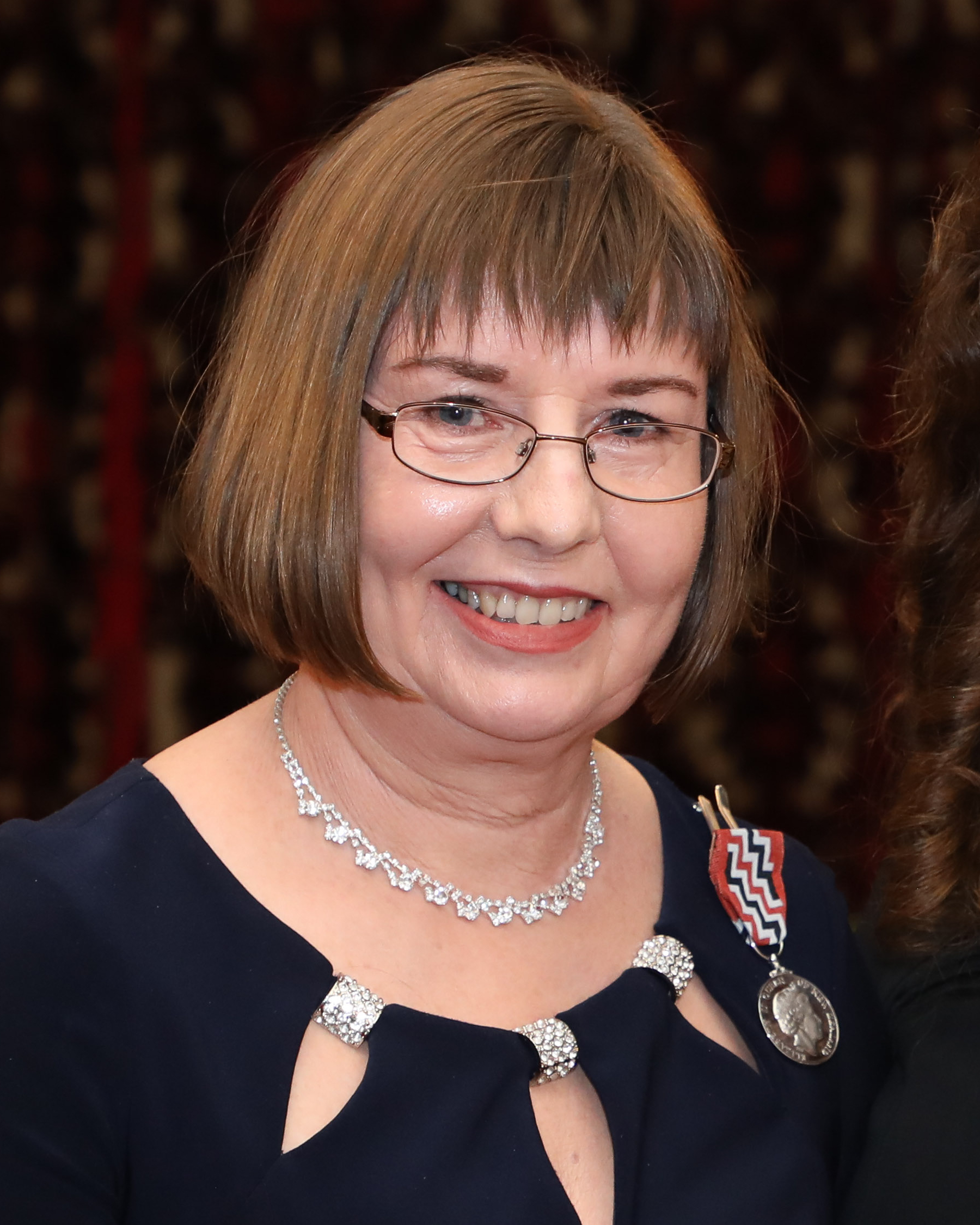
Nancy McShane

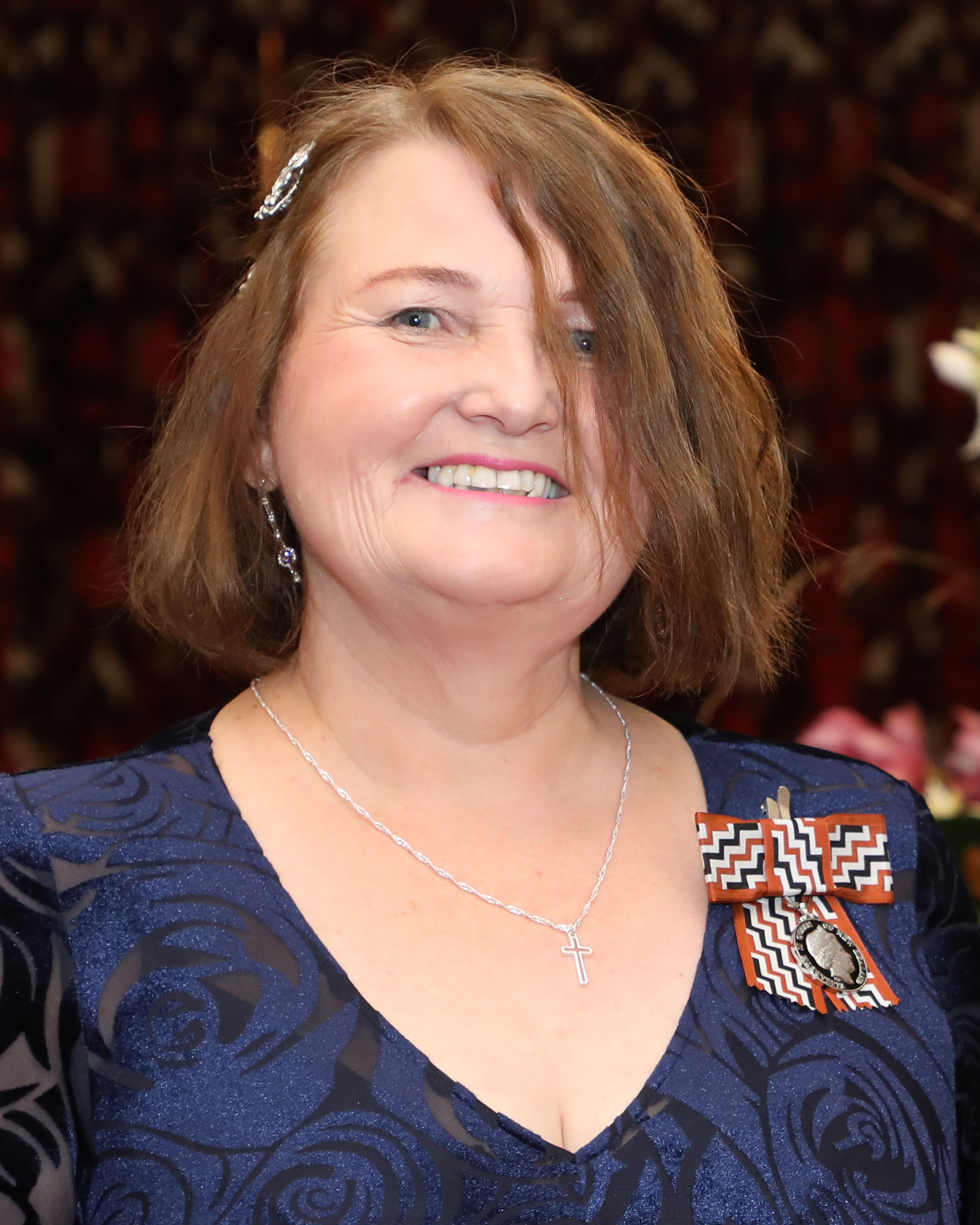
Karen Morris

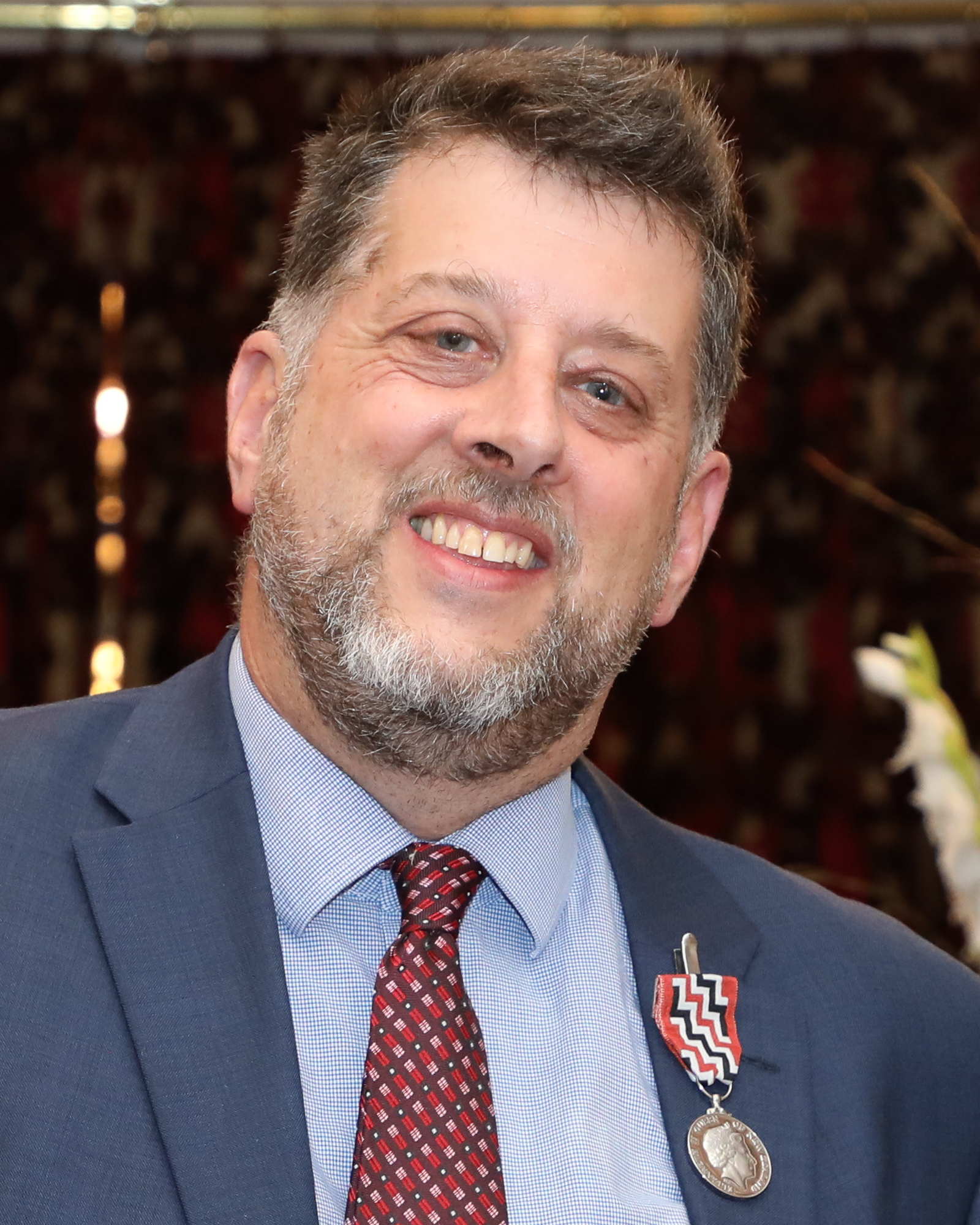
Ken Morris

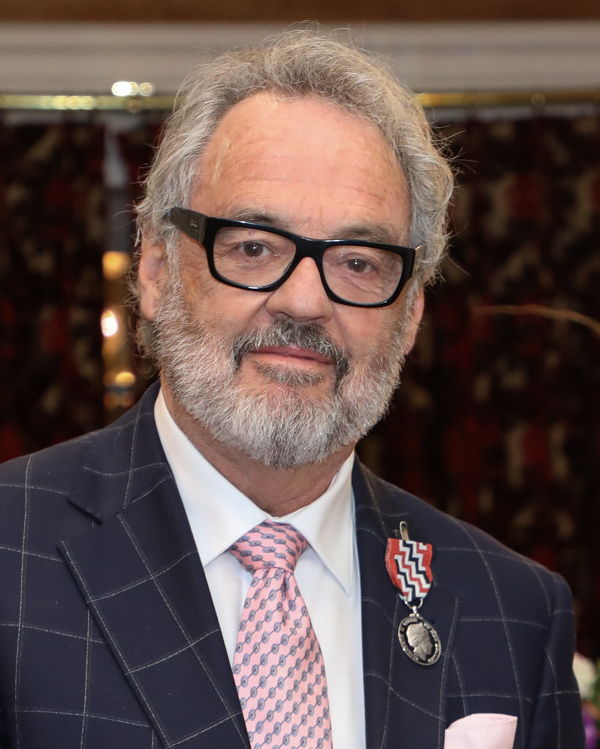
Euon Murrell

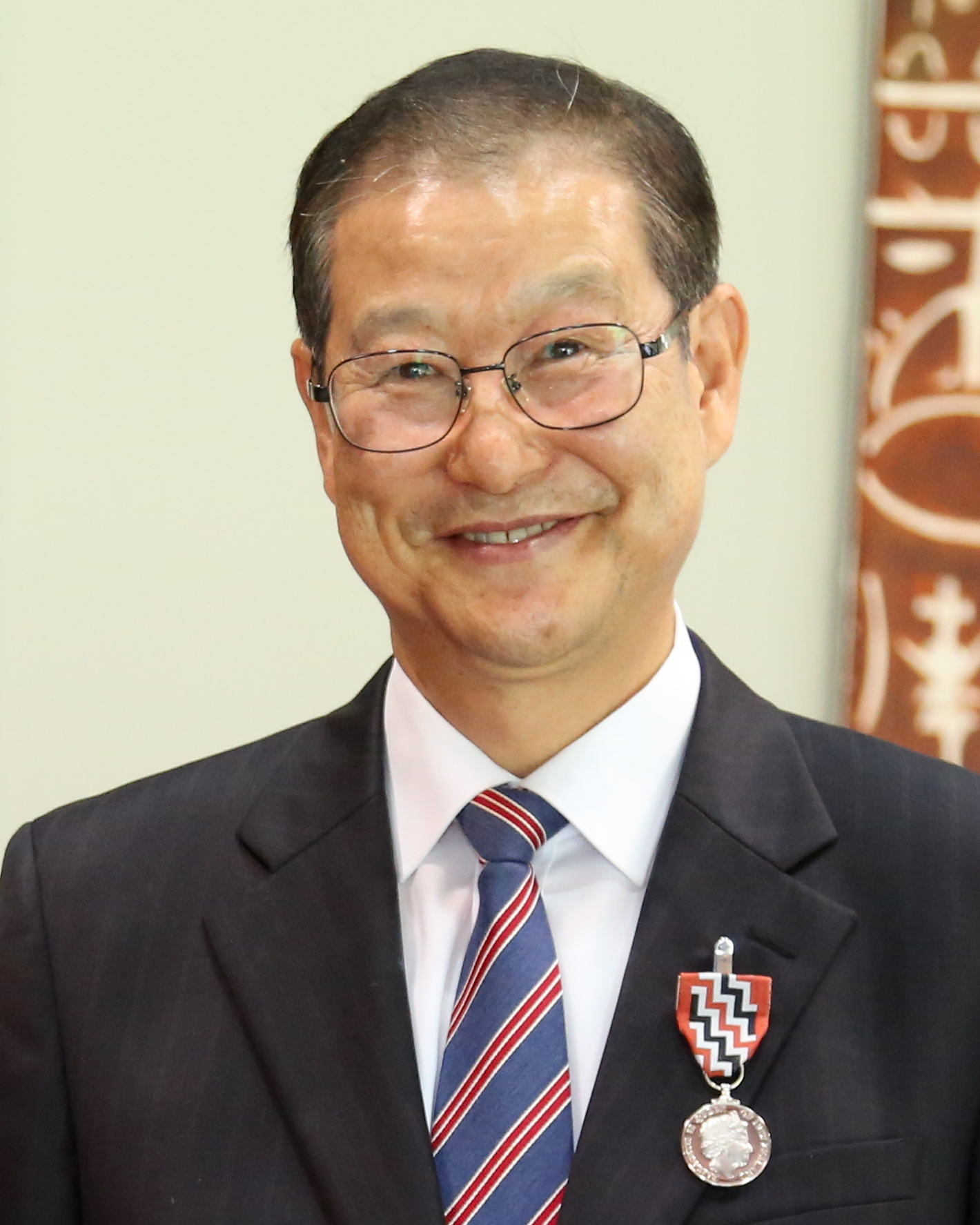
Woo Taek Nam

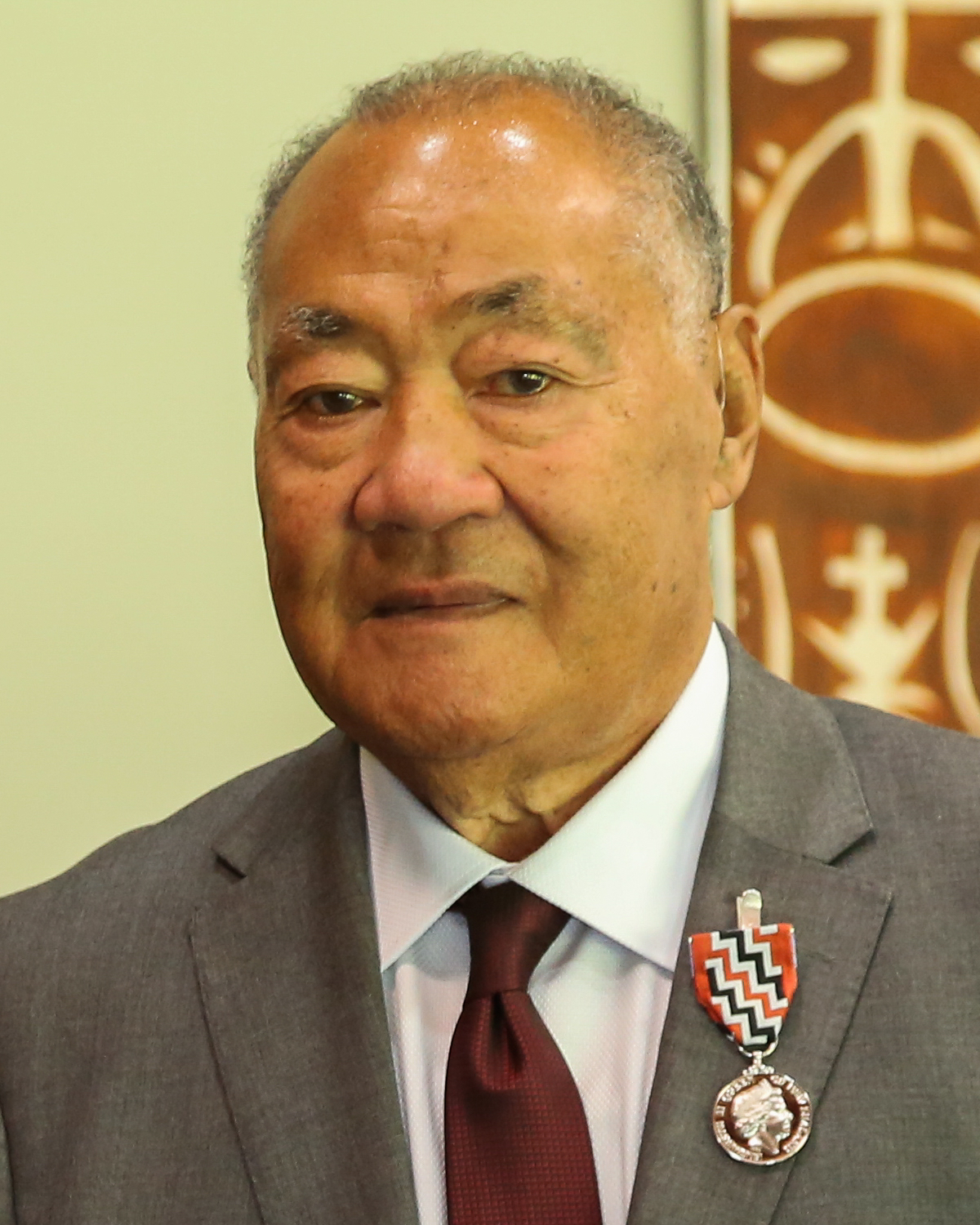
Lomia Naniseni

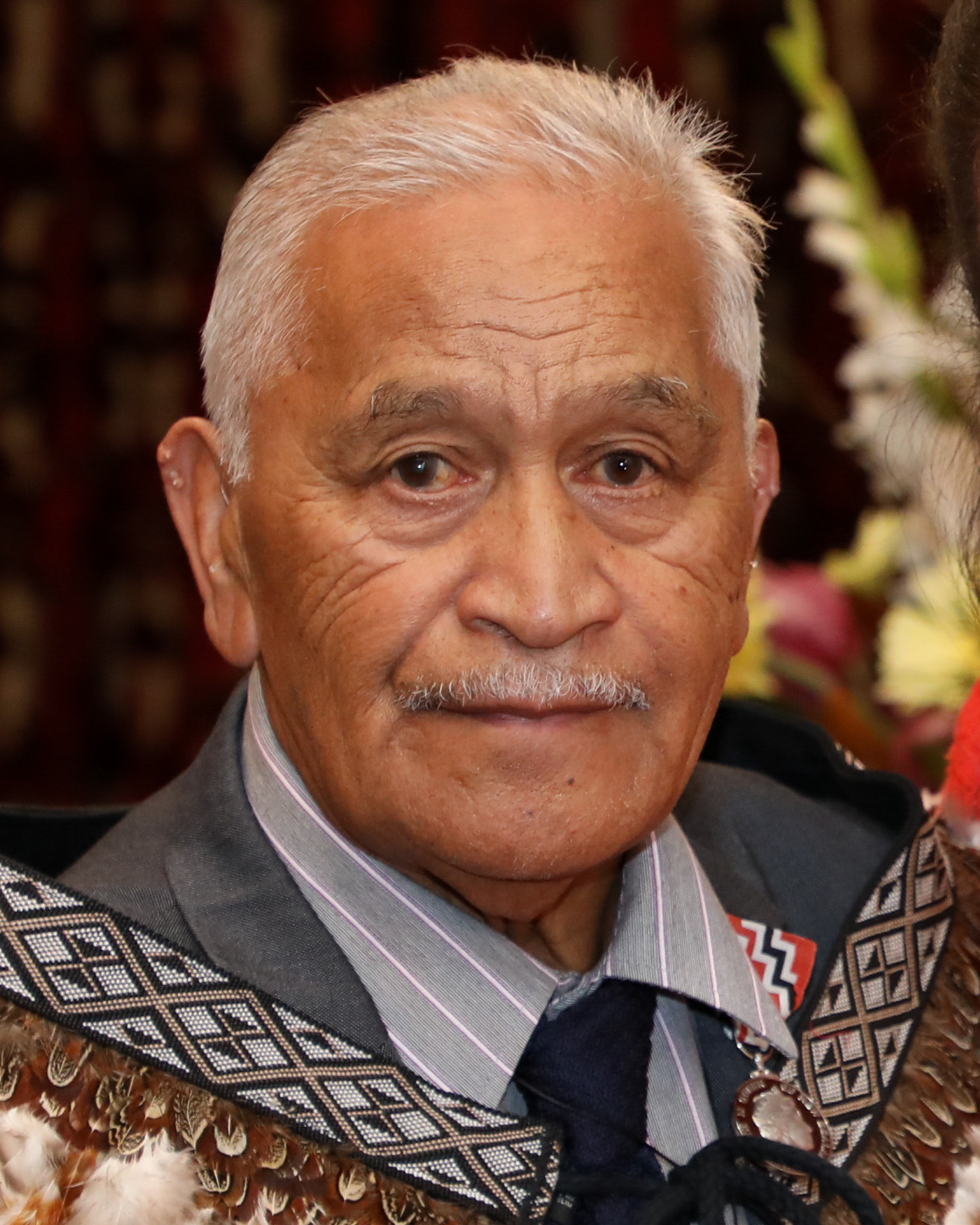
Hemi Ngarewa

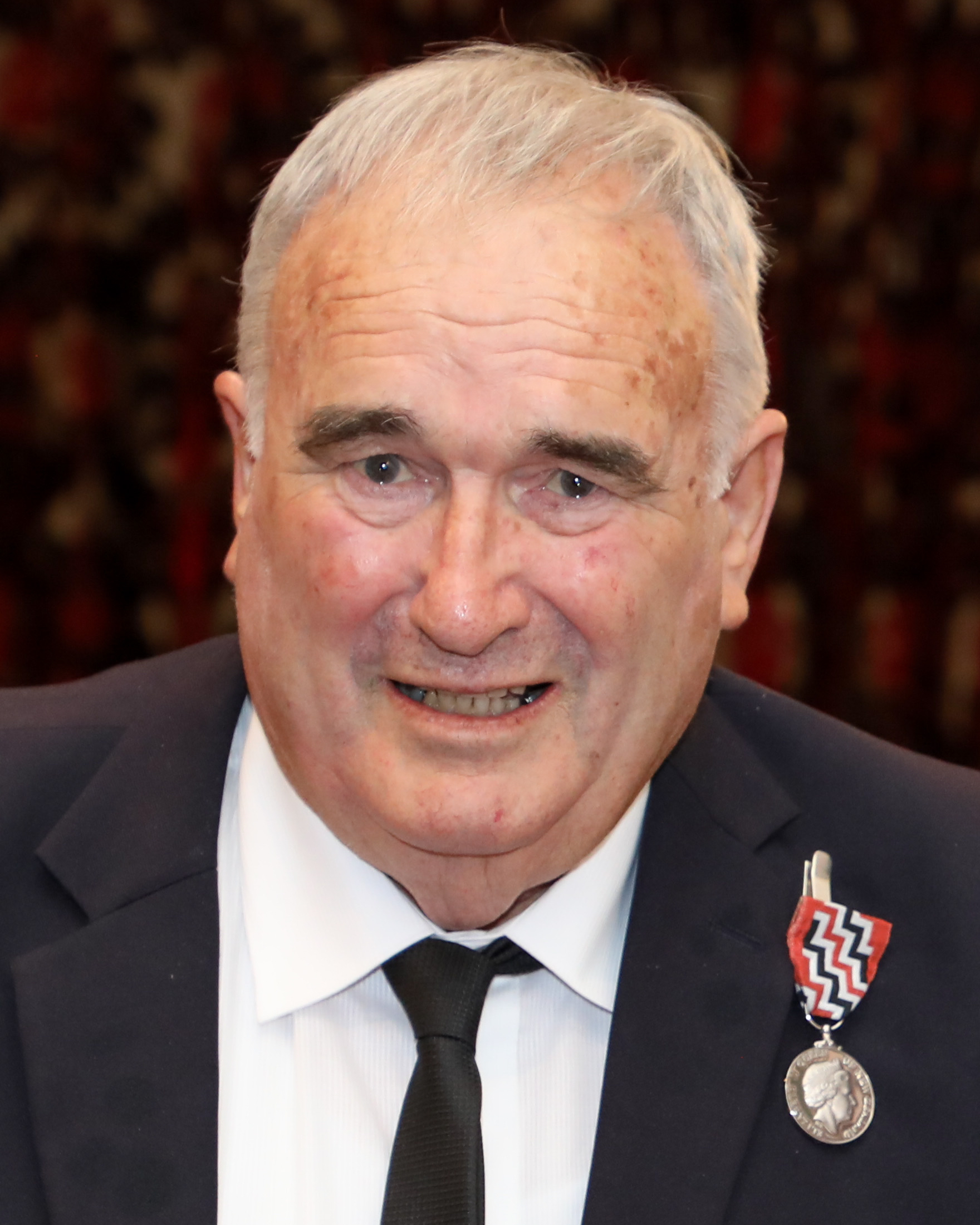
Gavin Nicol

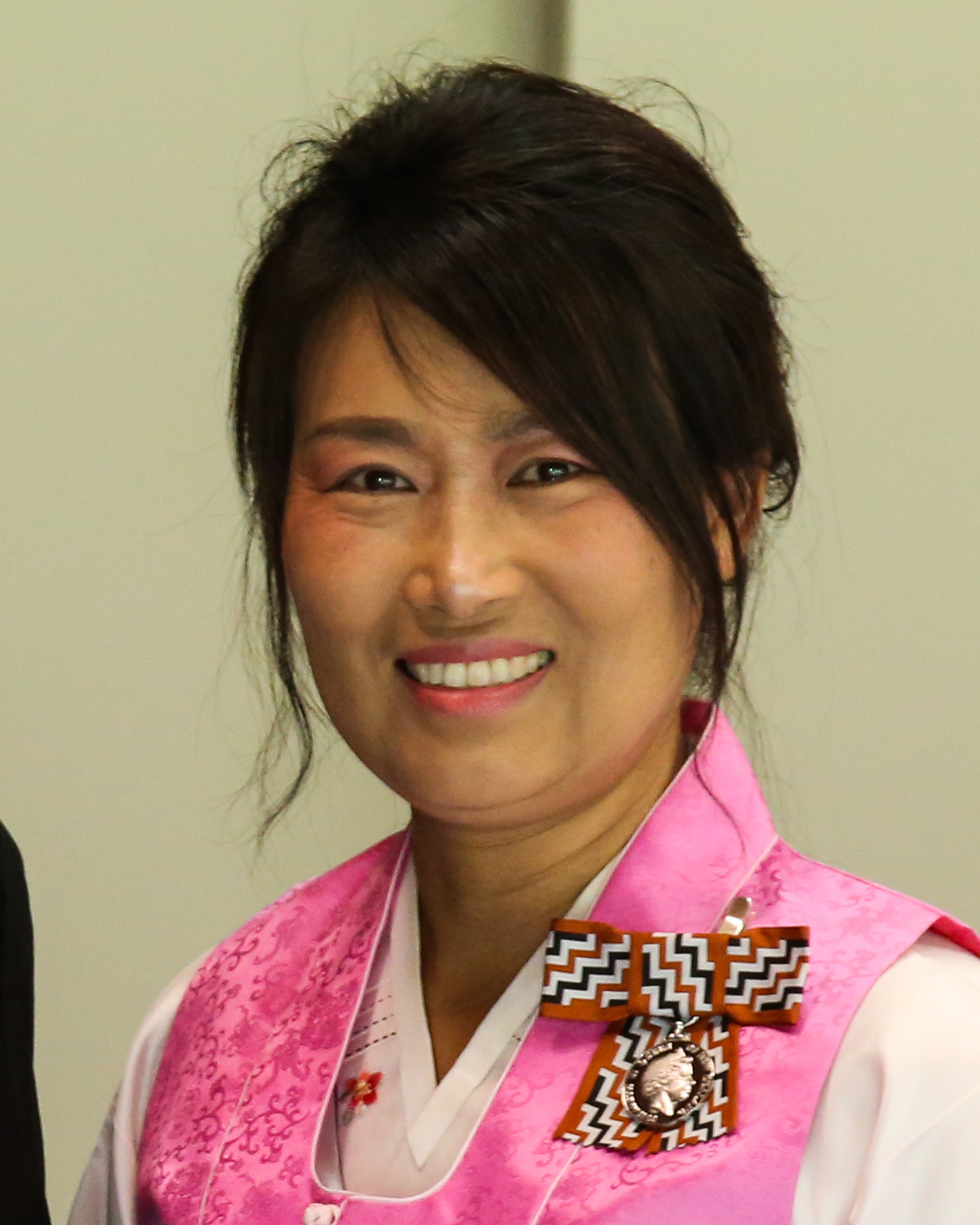
Yong Rahn Park

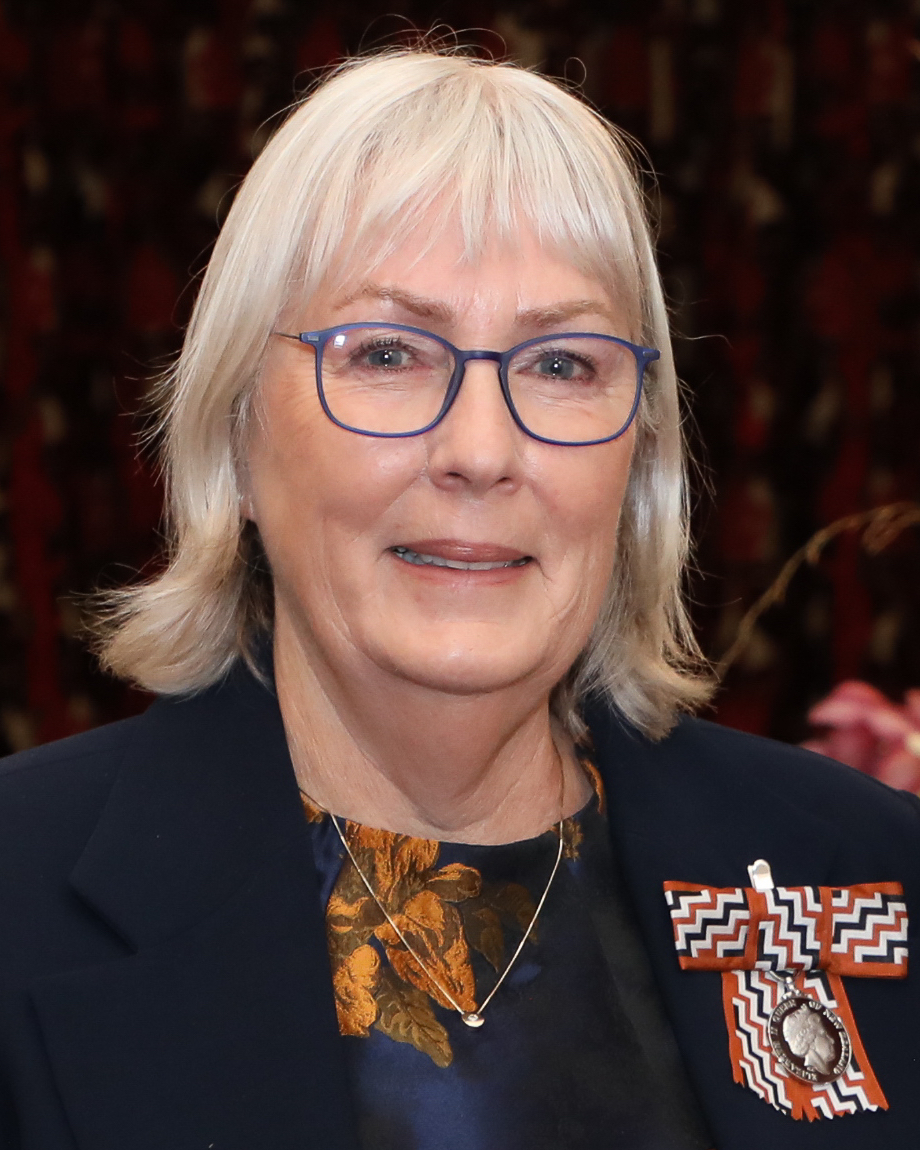
Linda Rutland

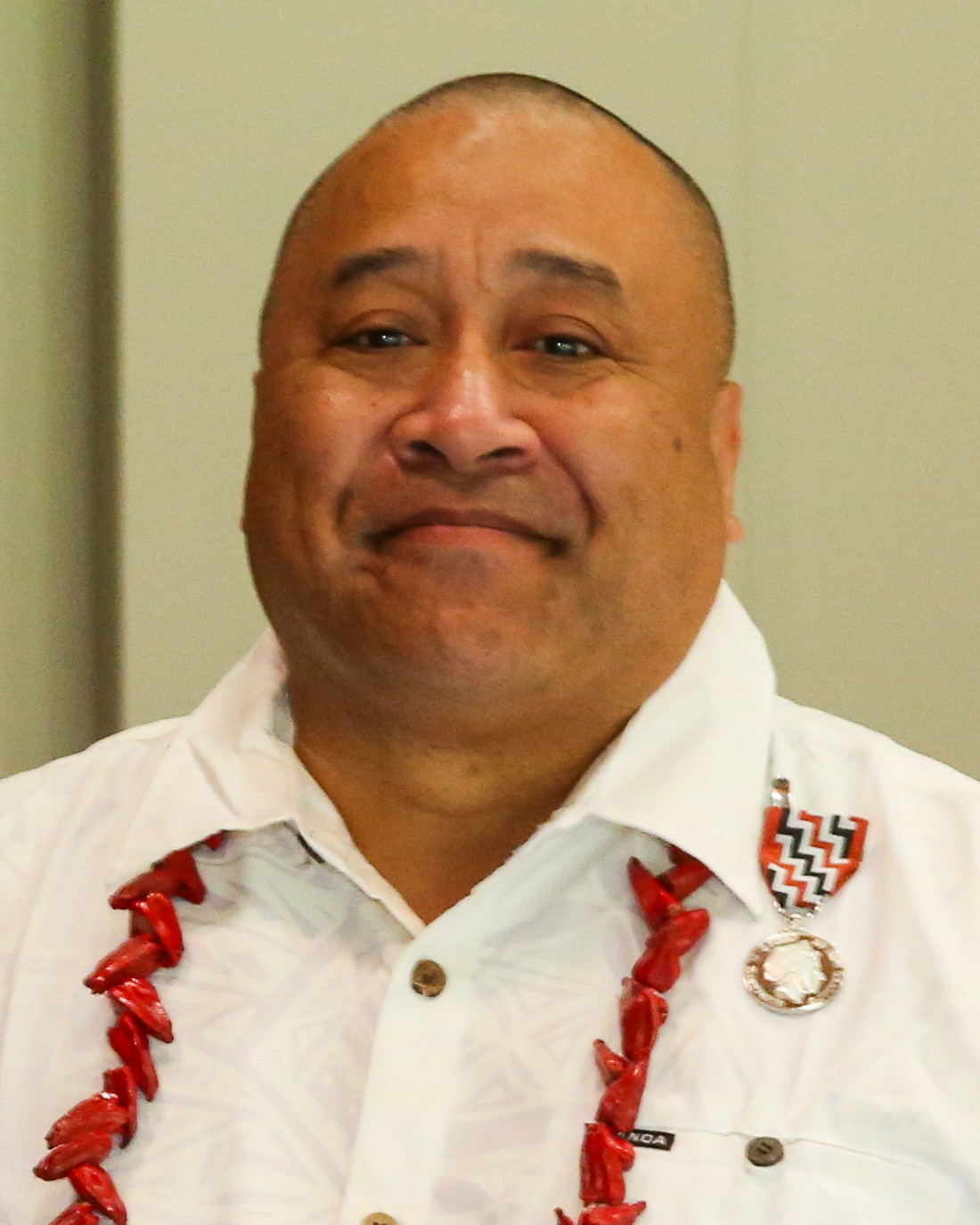
Ma'a Sagala

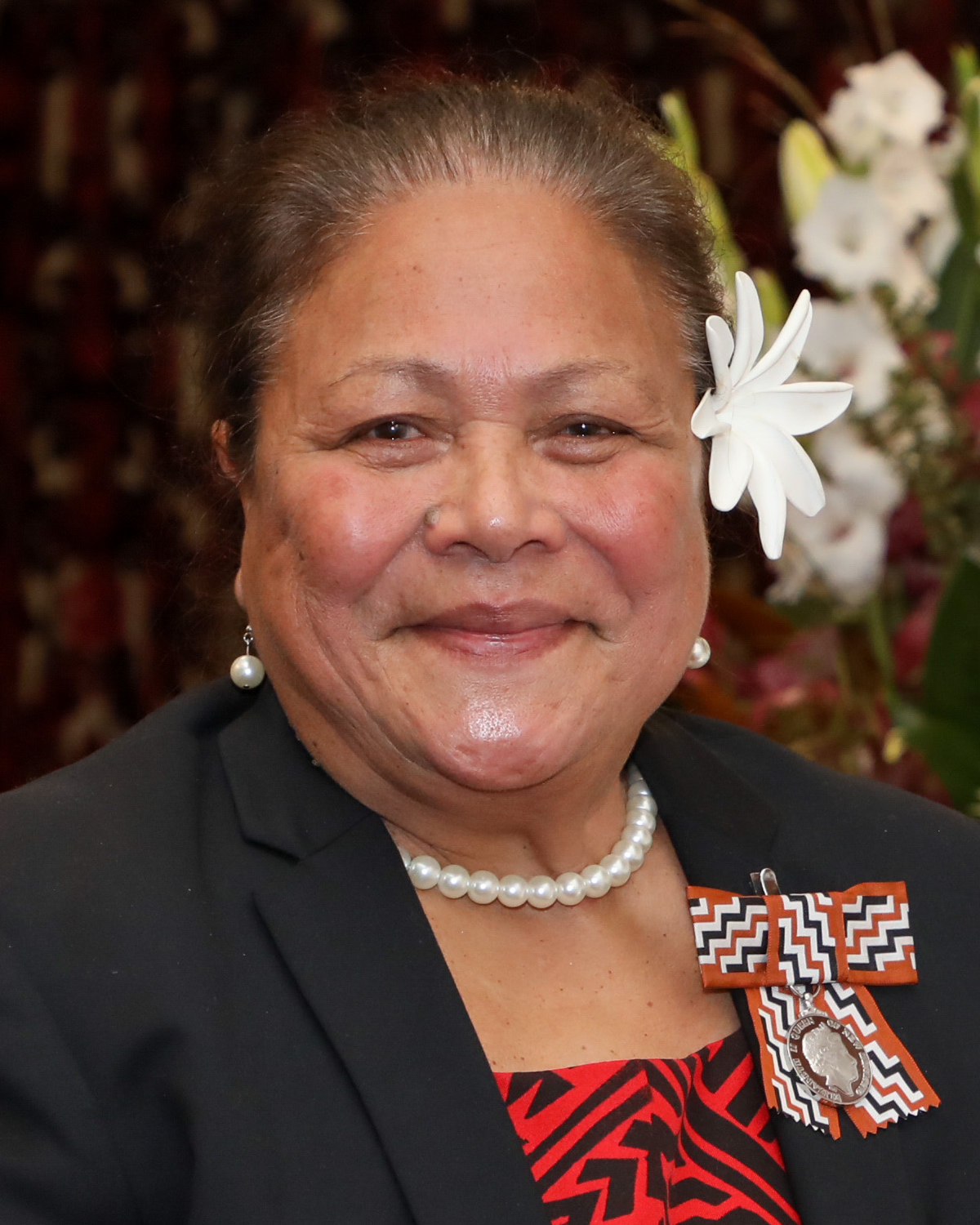
Mamaitaloa Sagapolutele

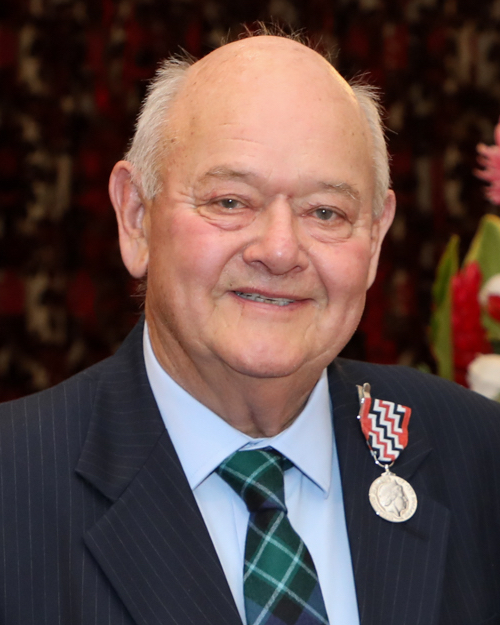
Ian Smith

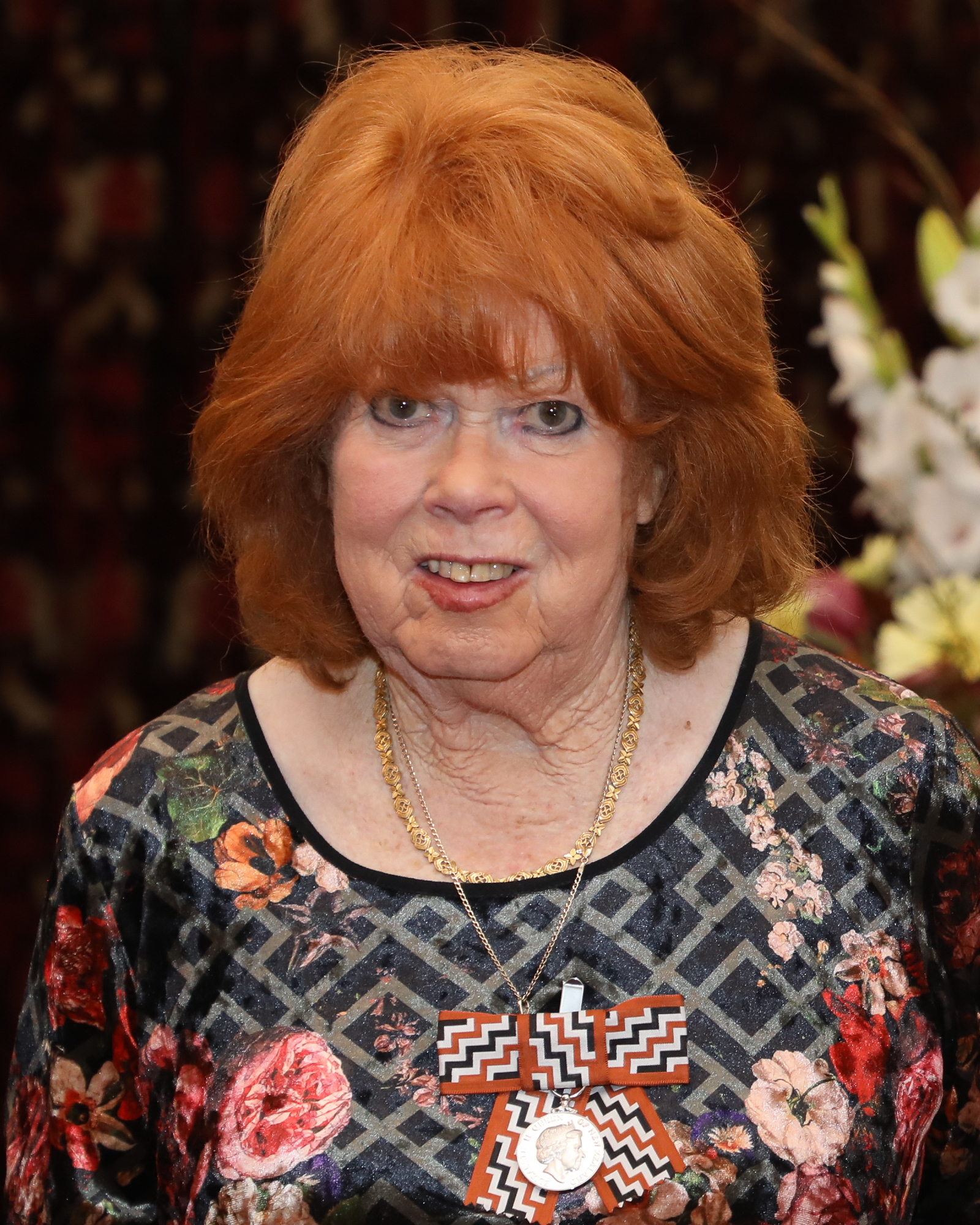
Patricia Smith

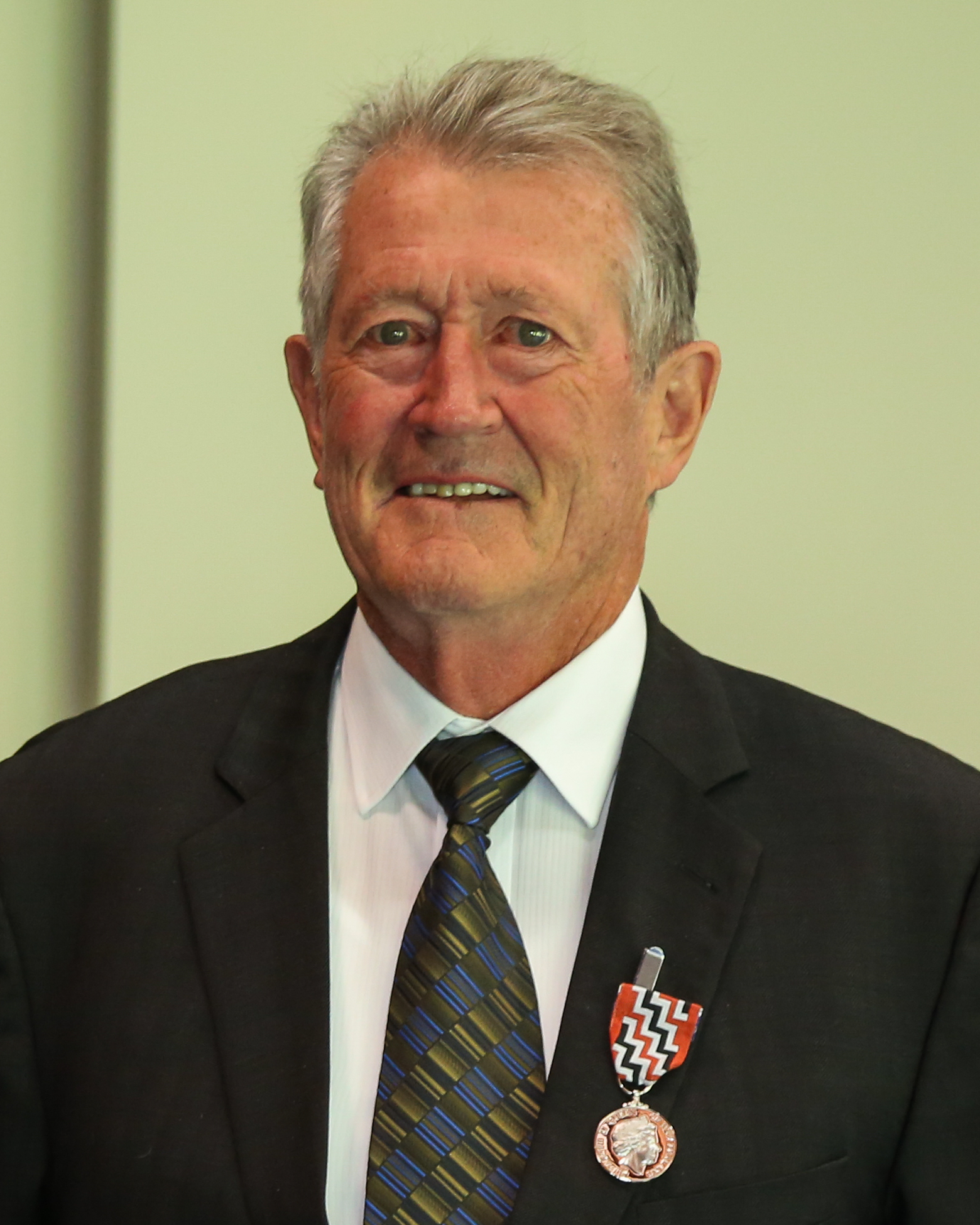
Don Thomas

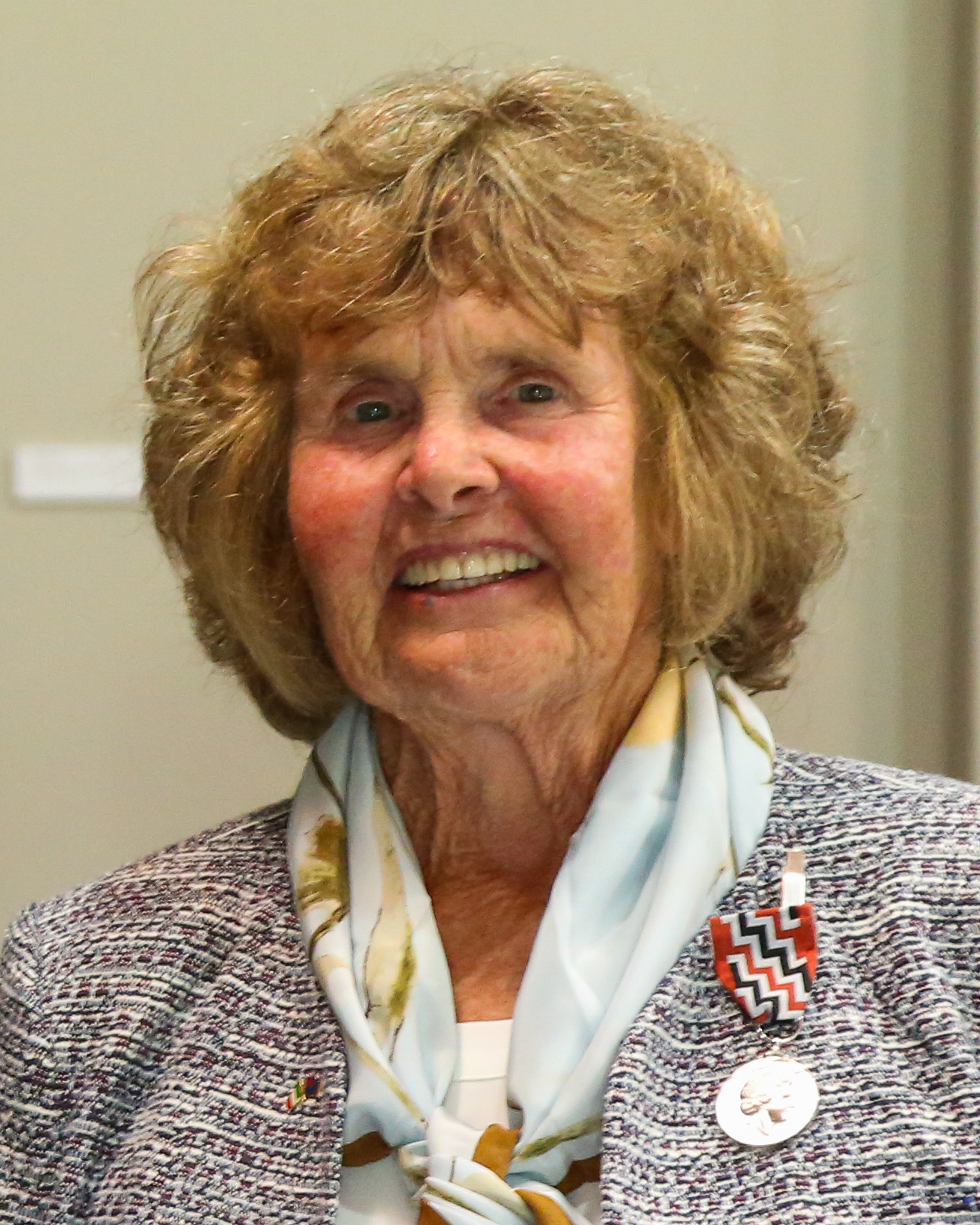
Pat Tondi

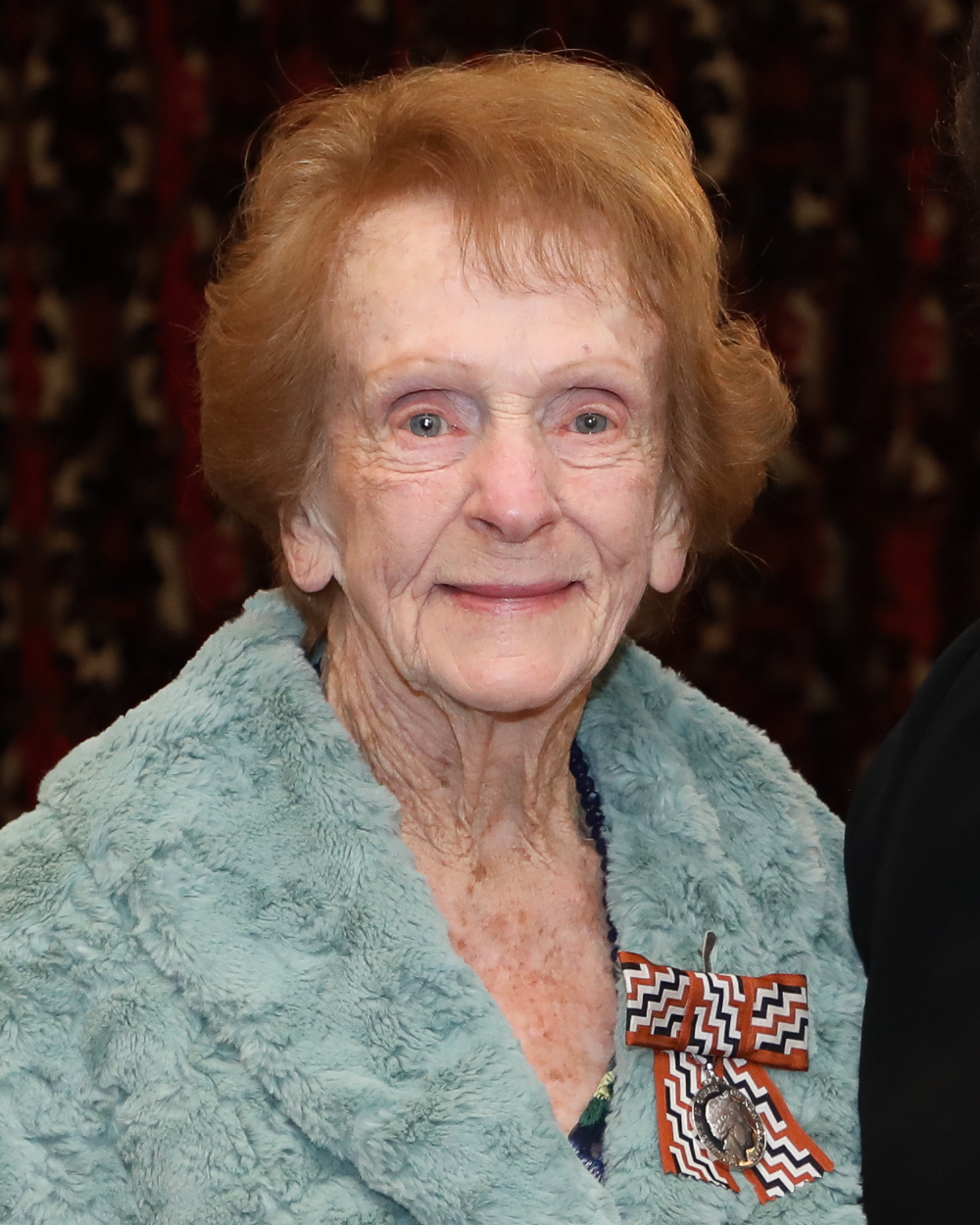
Mavis Tweedie

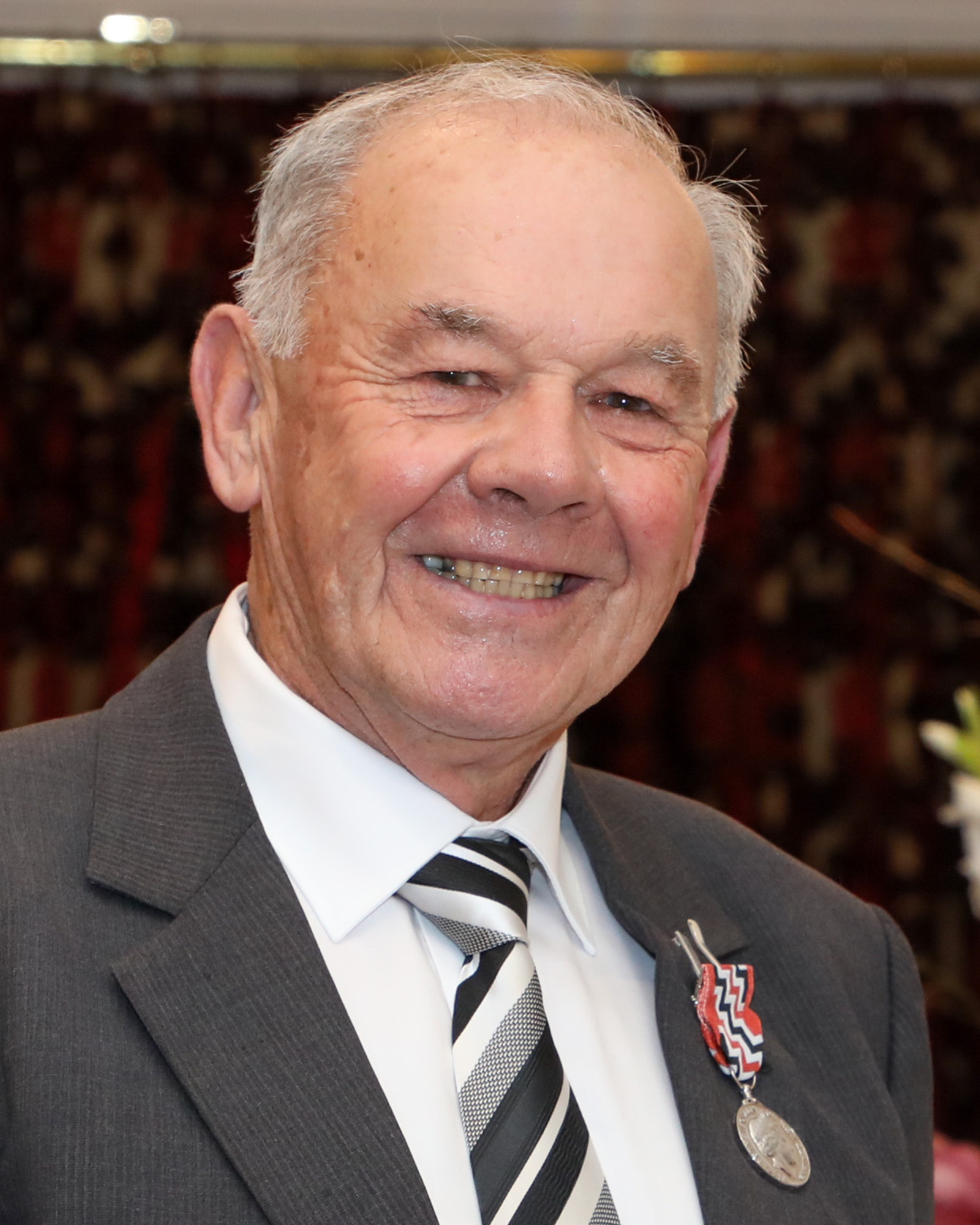
Kevin Watkins

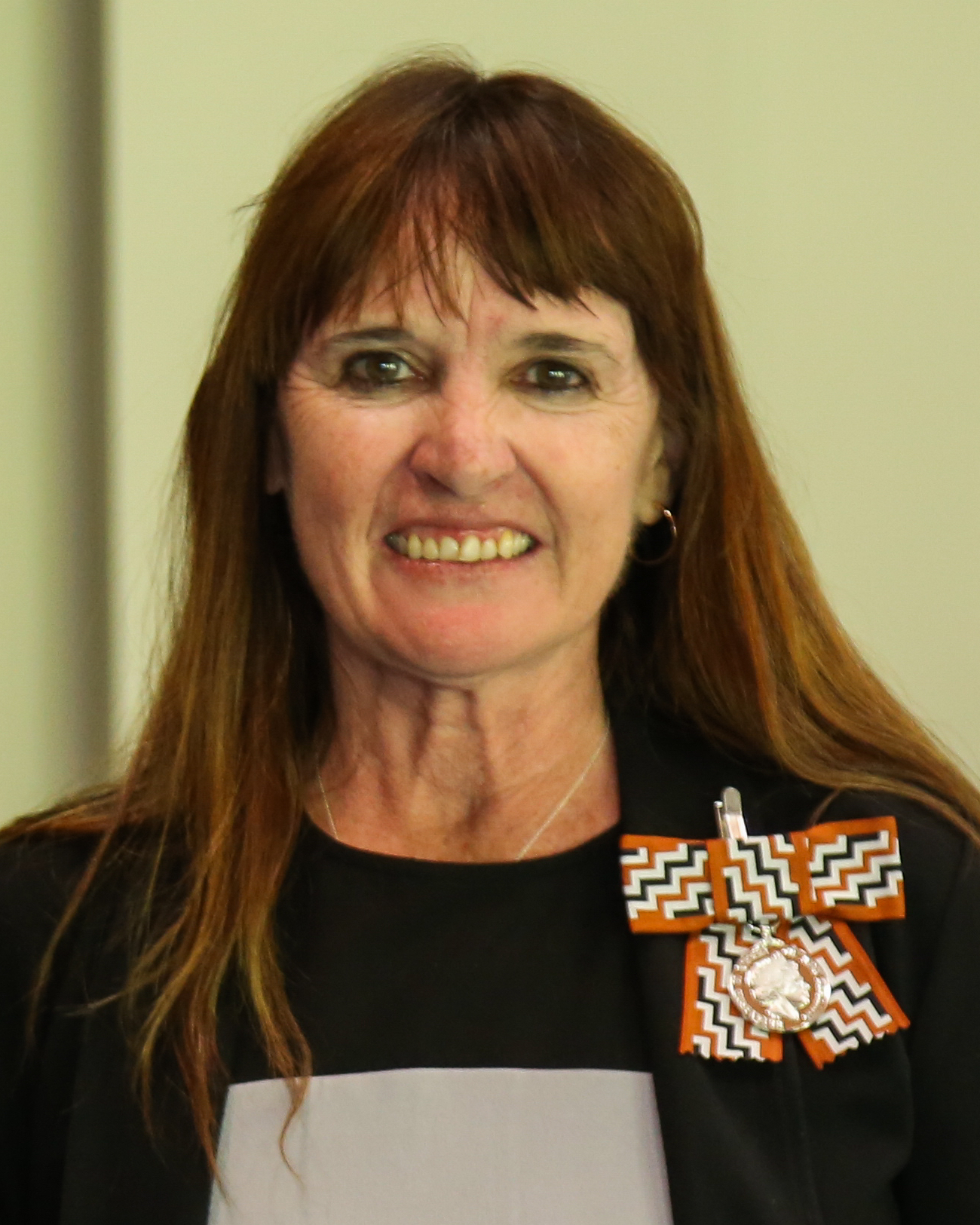
Helen Whittaker

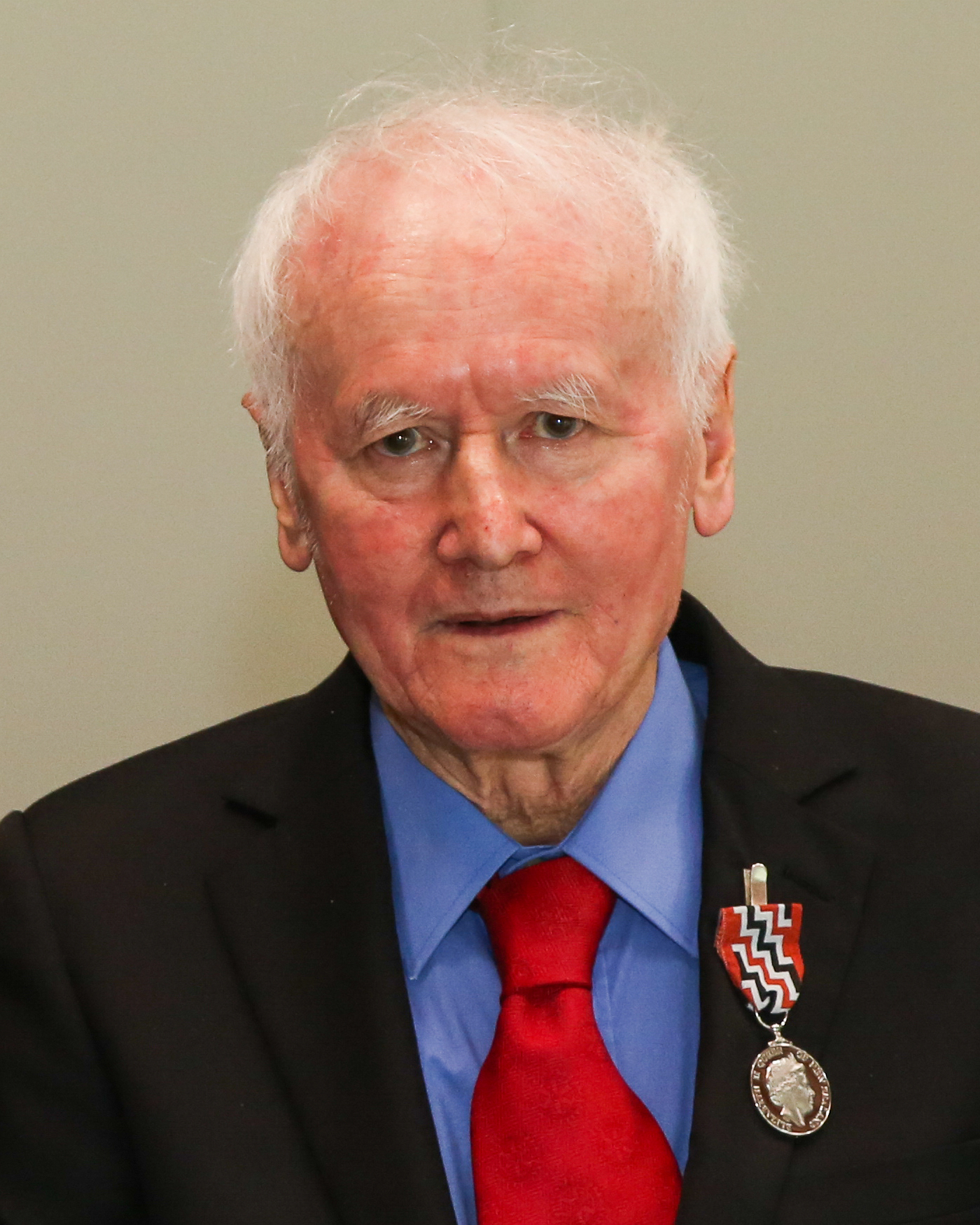
Robin Young

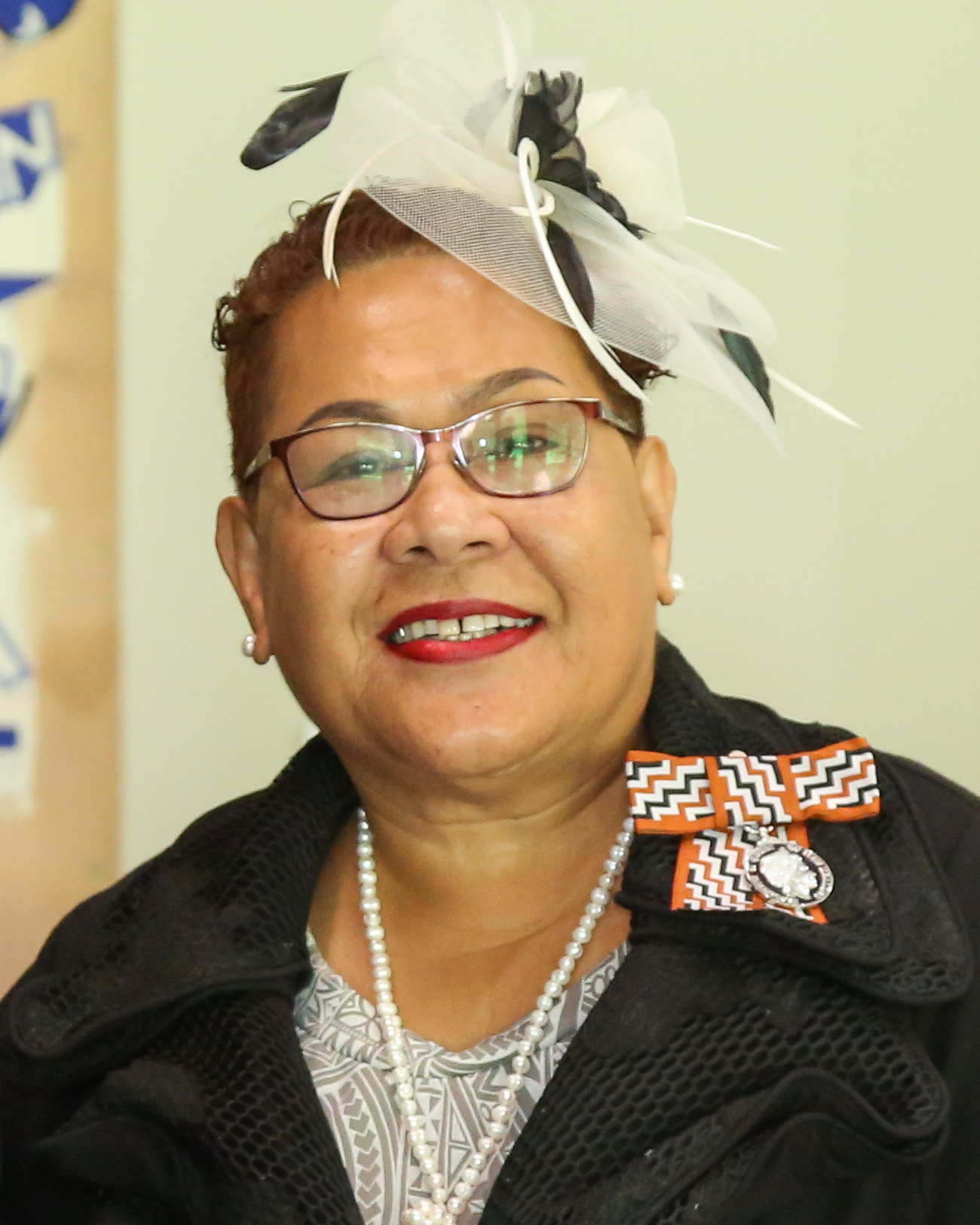
Nina Kirifi-Alai

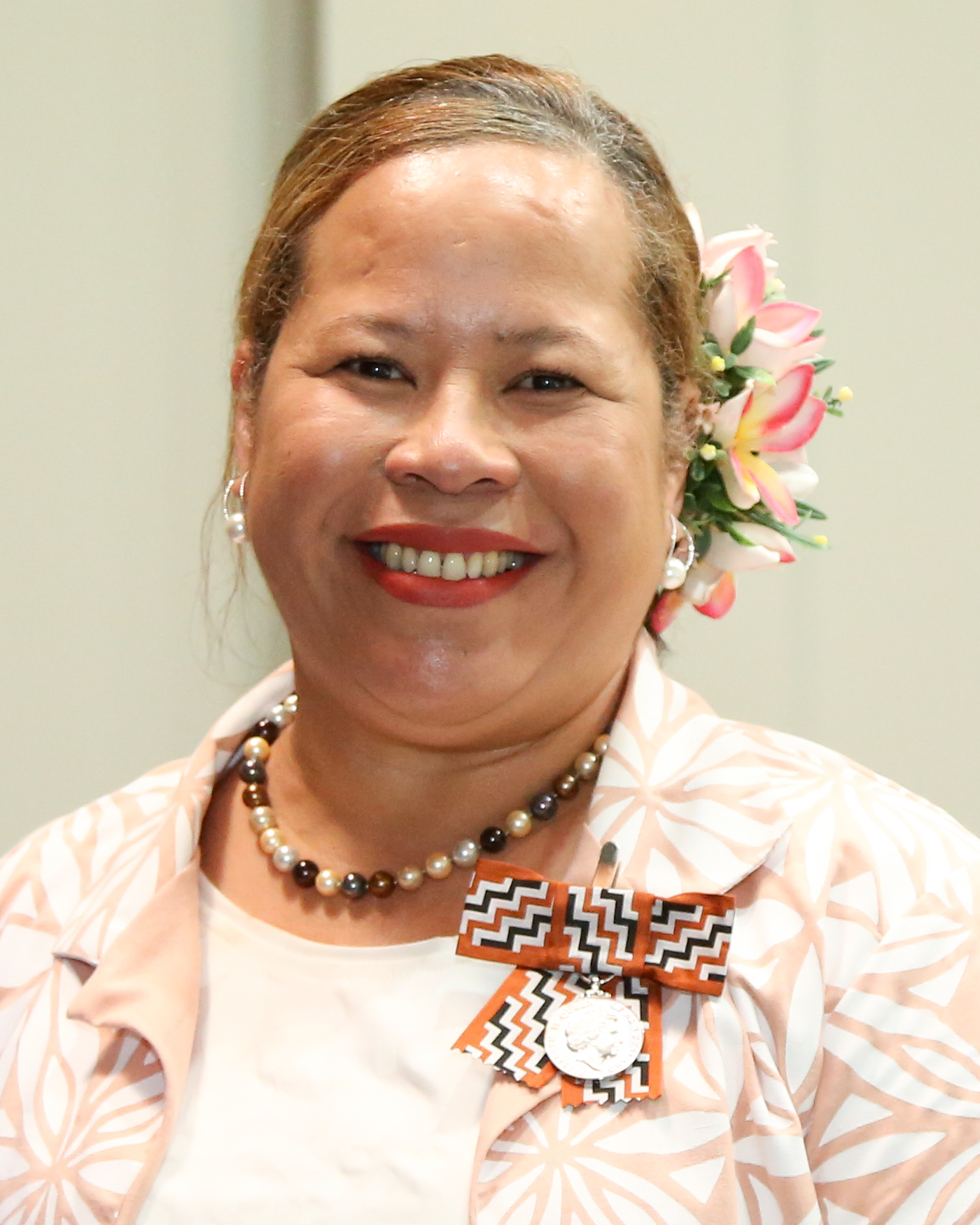
Maria Lafaele

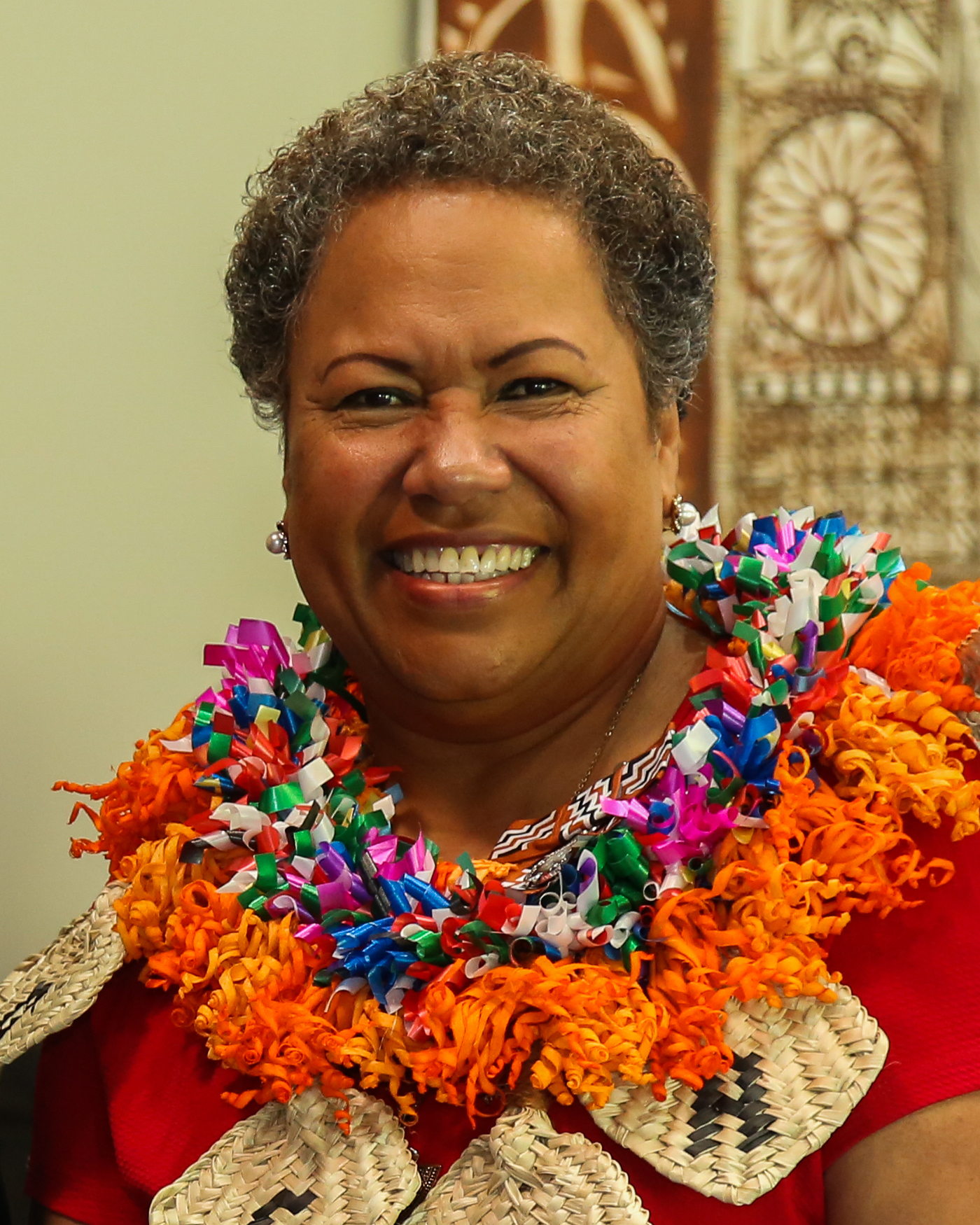
Nemai Vucago

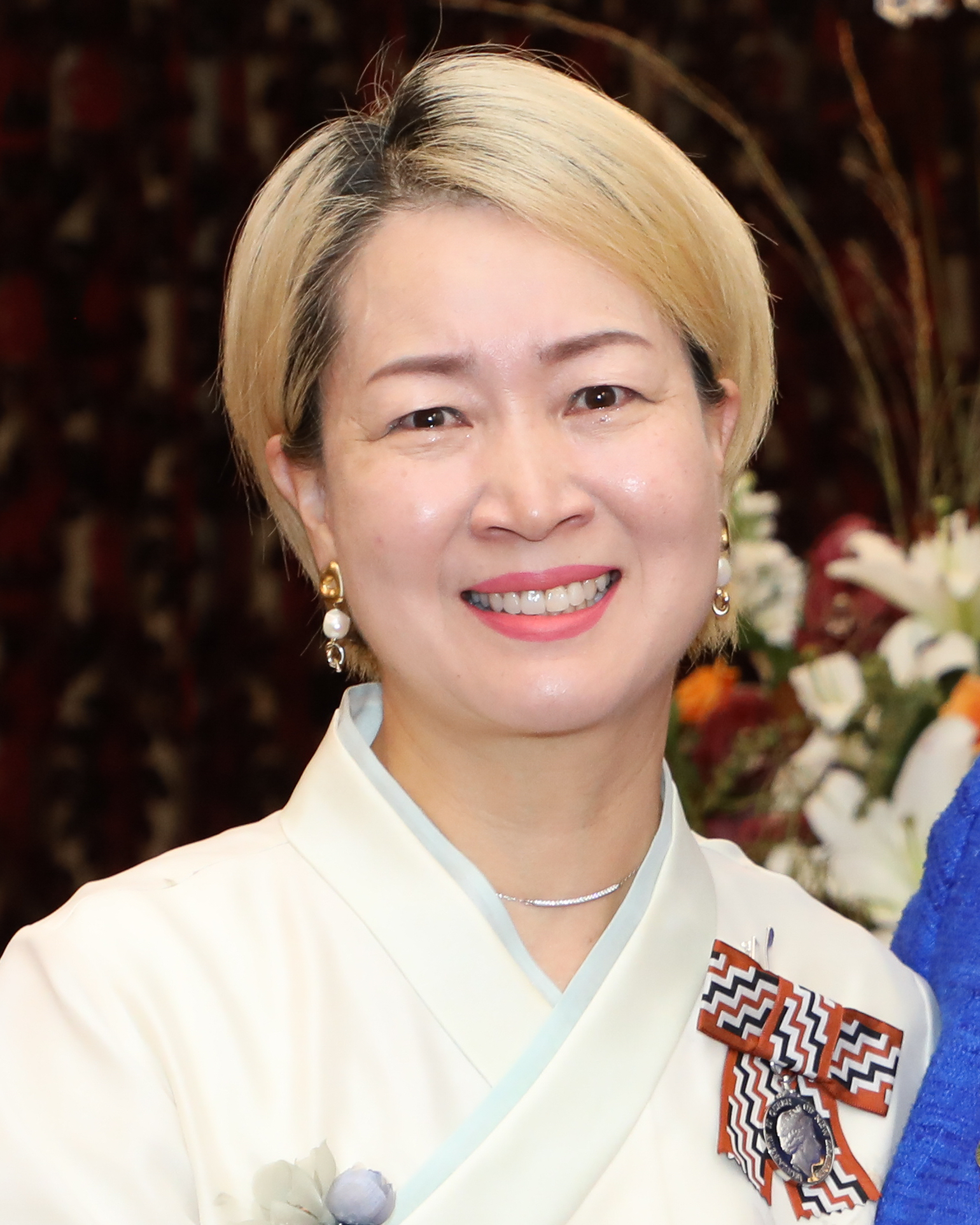
Kyojin Yun

== New Zealand Antarctic Medal (NZAM) ==
- Nigel John Watson – of Christchurch. For services to Antarctic heritage preservation.
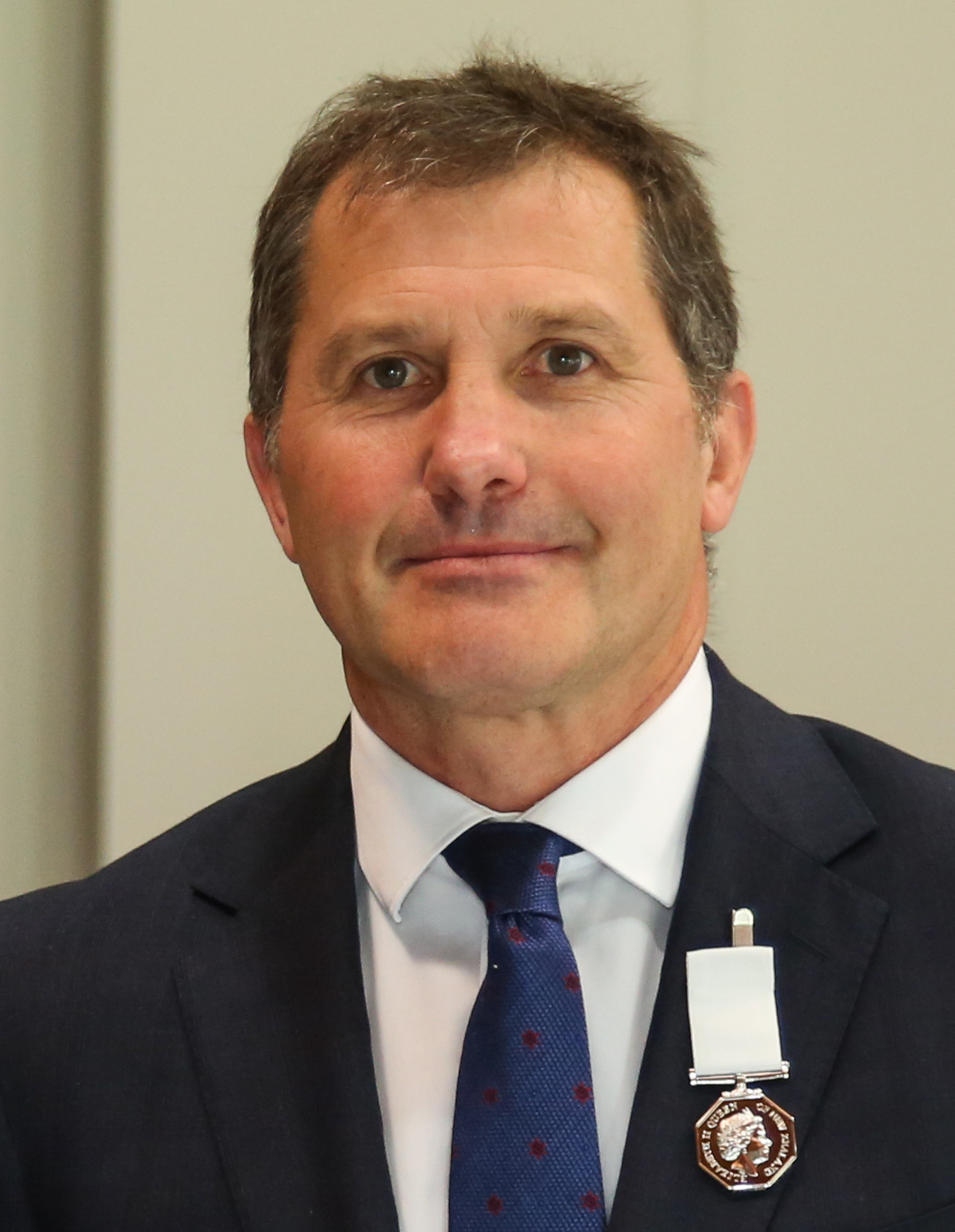
Nigel Watson

== New Zealand Distinguished Service Decoration (DSD) ==
- Captain Brendon John Clark – of Auckland. For services to the New Zealand Defence Force.
- Serviceman L. For services to the New Zealand Defence Force.
- Sergeant Hayden Peter Smith – of Wellington. For services to the New Zealand Defence Force.
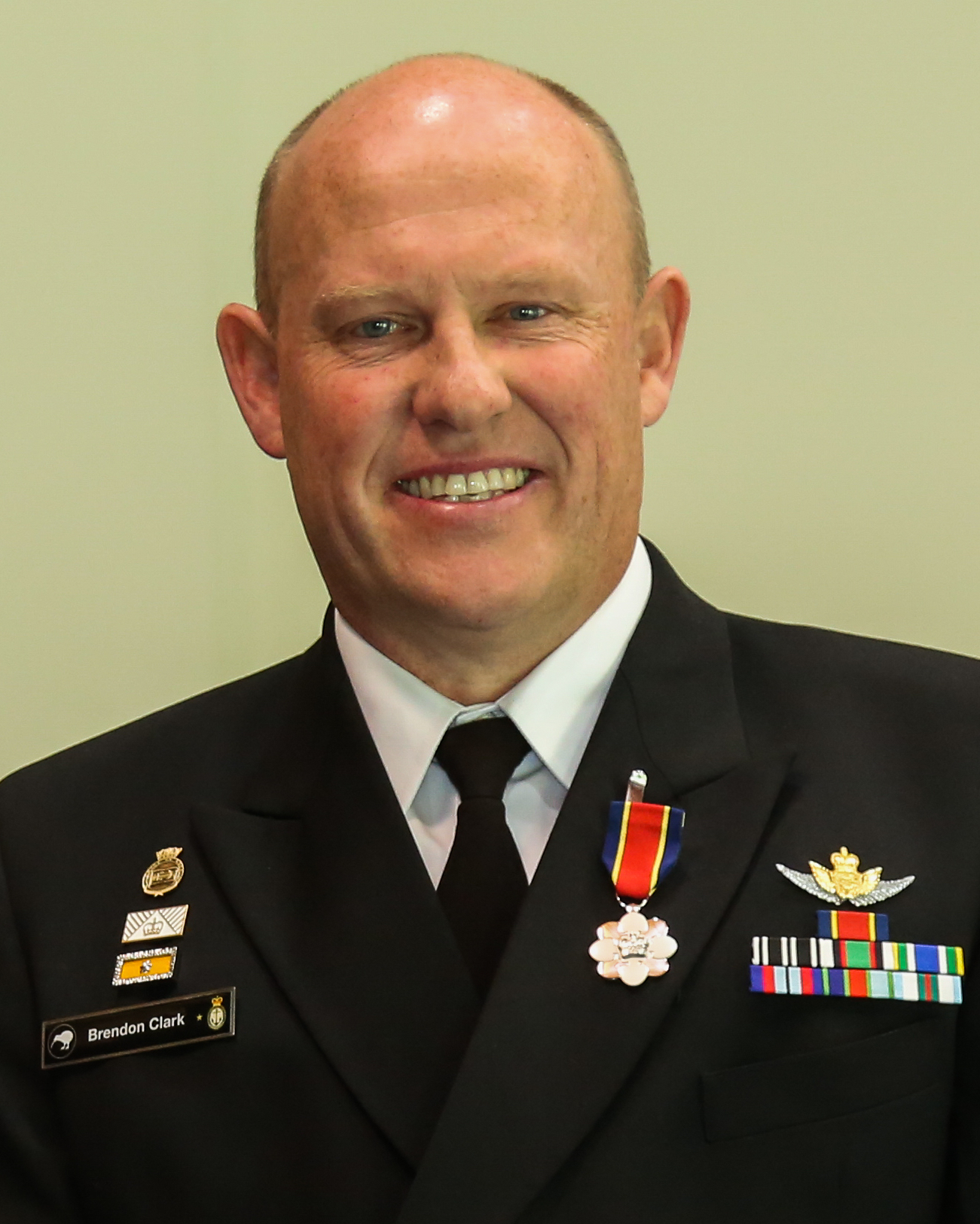
Brendon Clark

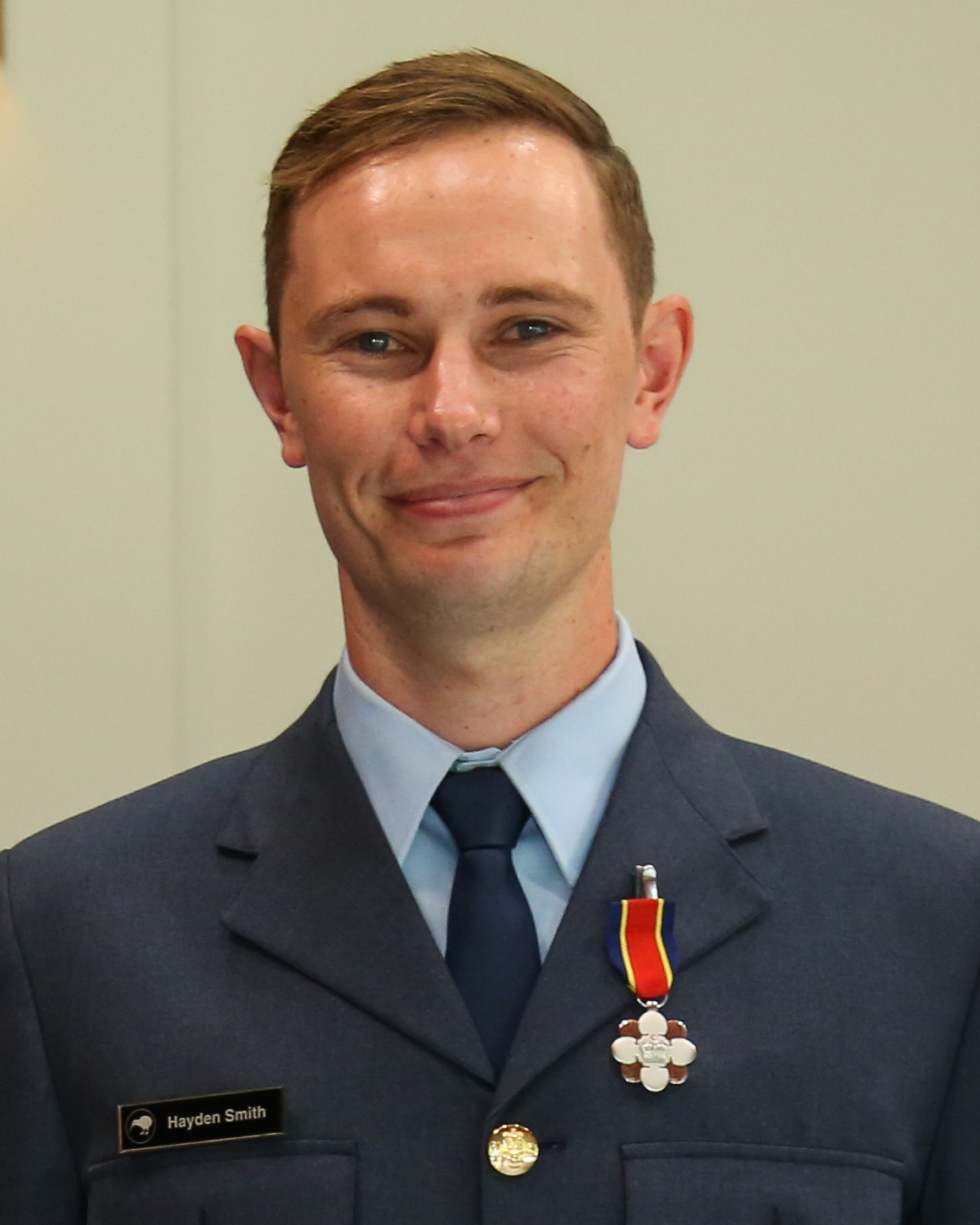
Hayden Smith
