= 2015 in sports =

2015 in sports describes the year's events in world sport. This year, some sporting events listed below are qualifying ones, for athletes, to compete at the 2016 Summer Olympics and Paralympics in Rio de Janeiro. From July 2015 to May 2016, the venues for the 2016 Summer Olympics and Paralympics will be tested, by hosting various events in them.

== Calendar by month ==
=== January ===
Date	Sport	Venue/Event	Status	Winner/s
26 December 2014–6	Ice hockey	(Canada) 2015 World Junior Ice Hockey Championship	International	Canada
28 December 2014–6	Ski jumping	(Germany) / (Austria) 2014–15 Four Hills Tournament	Continental	(Austria) Stefan Kraft
1	Ice hockey	(United States) 2015 NHL Winter Classic	Domestic	(Washington, D.C.) Washington Capitals
3–11	Cross-country skiing	(Germany) / (Switzerland) / (Italy) 2015 Tour de Ski	Continental	Men: (Norway) Martin Johnsrud Sundby; Women: (Norway) Marit Bjørgen
4–10	Ice hockey	(France) 2015 IIHF World Women's U18 Championship – Division I	International	France is promoted to Top Division; Austria is relegated to Division I Qualification
4–10	Tennis	(Australia) 2015 Hopman Cup	International	Poland
4–17	Rallying	(Argentina) / (Bolivia) / (Chile) 2015 Dakar Rally	International	Bikes: (Spain) Marc Coma ( (Austria) KTM); Quads: (Poland) Rafał Sonik ( (Japan) Yamaha); Cars: (Qatar) Nasser Al-Attiyah / (France) Matthieu Baumel ( (United Kingdom) Mini); Trucks: (Russia) Ayrat Mardeev / Aydar Belyaev / Dmitriy Svistunov ( (Russia) Kamaz)
5–12	Ice hockey	(United States) 2015 IIHF World Women's U18 Championship	International	United States
8–12	Table tennis	(United Arab Emirates) 2015 World Team Cup	International	Men: China; Women: China
9–24	Association football	(Jamaica) 2015 CONCACAF U-20 Championship	Continental	Mexico
9–31	Association football	(Australia) 2015 AFC Asian Cup	Continental	Australia
10–11	Speed skating	(Russia) 2015 European Speed Skating Championships	Continental	Men: (Netherlands) Sven Kramer; Women: (Netherlands) Ireen Wüst
11–18	Snooker	(United Kingdom) 2015 Masters	International	(England) Shaun Murphy
12	American football	(United States) 2015 College Football Playoff National Championship	Domestic	Ohio State Buckeyes
13–26	Association football	(American Samoa) 2015 OFC U-17 Championship	Continental	New Zealand
14–7 February	Association football	(Uruguay) 2015 South American Youth Football Championship	Continental	Argentina
15–25	Freestyle skiing & Snowboarding	(Austria) FIS Freestyle Ski and Snowboarding World Championships 2015	International	Freestyle Ski: Canada; Snowboarding: United States; Overall: United States
15–1 February	Handball	(Qatar) 2015 World Men's Handball Championship	International	France
16–17	Luge	(Norway) 2015 FIL Junior World Luge Championships	International	Men: (Russia) Roman Repilov; Women: (Germany) Jessica Tiebel; Men's Doubles: (Germany) Florian Loeffler / Manuel Stiebing; Team Relay: (Latvia) Ulla Zirne, Kristers Aparjods, and Kristens Putins & Karlis Kriss Matuzels
17–8 February	Association football	(Equatorial Guinea) 2015 Africa Cup of Nations	Continental	Ivory Coast
19–25	Ice hockey	(New Zealand) 2015 World Junior Ice Hockey Championships – Division III	International	China is promoted to Division II Group B
19–25	Ice hockey	(Poland) 2015 IIHF World Women's U18 Championship – Division I Qualification	International	Denmark is promoted to Division I
19–1 February	Tennis	(Australia) 2015 Australian Open	International	Men: (Serbia) Novak Djokovic; Women: (United States) Serena Williams
22–1 February	Nordic skiing	(United States) 2015 IPC Biathlon and Cross-Country Skiing World Championships	International	For cross-country results, click here. For biathlon results, click here.
23–25	Speed skating	(Netherlands) 2015 European Short Track Speed Skating Championships	Continental	Men's overall winner: Sjinkie Knegt; Men's medal tally: Netherlands and Russia (2 gold medals each.); Women's overall winner: (United Kingdom) Elise Christie; Women's medal tally: Great Britain and Russia (2 gold medals each.)
24–25	Luge	(Germany) 2015 Junior European Luge Championships	International	Men's winner: (Germany) Sabastian Bley; Women's winner: (Germany) Jessica Tiebel; Men's Doubles winners: (Germany) Florian Loeffler / Manuel Stiebing; Team Relay winners: (Russia) Victoria Demchenko, Roman Repilov, Evgeny Evdokimov & Alexei Groshev
24–1 February	Multi-sport	(Slovakia) 2015 Winter Universiade (co-host with Spain)	International	Russia (Venues: Štrbské Pleso and Osrblie)
25	American football	(United States) 2015 Pro Bowl	Domestic	Team Irvin; Offensive MVP: (Florida) Matthew Stafford ( (Michigan) Detroit Lions); Defensive MVP: (Wisconsin) J. J. Watt ( (Texas) Houston Texans)
25	Ice hockey	(United States) 2015 NHL All-Star Game	Domestic	Team Toews; MVP: (Canada) Ryan Johansen ( (Ohio) Columbus Blue Jackets)
25–15 November	Rallying	(European Union) / (Mexico) / (Argentina) / (Australia) 2015 World Rally Championship season	International	WRC #1: (France) Sébastien Ogier / (France) Julien Ingrassia; WRC #2: (Qatar) Nasser Al-Attiyah / (France) Matthieu Baumel; WRC #3: (France) Quentin Gilbert / (Belgium) Renaud Jamoul
26–1 February	Figure skating	(Sweden) 2015 European Figure Skating Championships	Continental	Men: (Spain) Javier Fernández; Ladies: (Russia) Elizaveta Tuktamysheva; Pairs: (Russia) Yuko Kavaguti / Alexander Smirnov; Ice Dance: (France) Gabriella Papadakis / Guillaume Cizeron
27–3 February	Biathlon	(Estonia) 2015 IBU Open European Championships	Continental	Junior: Russia; Senior: Russia
31	Triathlon	(Spain) 2015 ETU Winter Triathlon European Championships	Continental	Men: (Russia) Pavel Andreev; Women: (Russia) Olga Parfinenko
31–1 February	Cyclo-cross	(Czech Republic) 2015 UCI Cyclo-cross World Championships	International	Men's Elite: (Netherlands) Mathieu van der Poel; Women's Elite: (France) Pauline Ferrand-Prévot
31–8 February	Multi-sport	(Canada) 2015 Winter World Masters Games	International	For results, click here.

=== February ===
Date	Sport	Venue/Event	Status	Winner/s
1	American football	(United States) Super Bowl XLIX	Domestic	(Massachusetts) New England Patriots; MVP: (California) Tom Brady ( (Massachusetts) New England Patriots)
2–15	Alpine skiing	(United States) FIS Alpine World Ski Championships 2015	International	Austria
3–5 August	Association football	2015 Copa Libertadores	Continental	(Argentina) River Plate
4–8	Snooker	(Germany) 2015 German Masters	International	(England) Mark Selby
4–14	Multi-sport	(Spain) 2015 Winter Universiade (co-host with Slovakia)	International	Russia (Venue: Granada)
4–21 November	Association football	2015 AFC Champions League	Continental	(China) Guangzhou Evergrande
6 & 11	Association football	(Argentina) 2015 Recopa Sudamericana	Continental	(Argentina) River Plate
6–13	Curling	(Finland) 2015 World Wheelchair Curling Championship	International	Russia (Skip: Andrey Smirnov)
7–15 November	Tennis	2015 Fed Cup	International	Czech Republic
9–15	Figure skating	(South Korea) 2015 Four Continents Figure Skating Championships	International	Men: (Kazakhstan) Denis Ten; Ladies: (United States) Polina Edmunds; Pairs: (Canada) Meagan Duhamel / Eric Radford; Ice dance: (Canada) Kaitlyn Weaver / Andrew Poje
9–31 October	Association football	2015 AFC Cup	Continental	(Malaysia) Johor Darul Ta'zim
12–15	Badminton	(Belgium) 2015 European Mixed Team Badminton Championships	Continental	Denmark
12–15	Speed skating	(Netherlands) 2015 World Single Distance Speed Skating Championships	International	Netherlands
13–14	Air racing	(United Arab Emirates) 2015 Red Bull Air Race World Championship season – Abu Dhabi	International	Master Class: (United Kingdom) Paul Bonhomme (Aircraft: Zivko Edge 540 from (United States) Zivko Aeronautics); Challenger Class: (Chile) Cristian Bolton (Aircraft: Extra 330LX from (Germany) Extra Flugzeugbau)
13–8 November	Association football	2015 CAF Champions League	Continental	(Democratic Republic of the Congo) TP Mazembe
13–29 November	Association football	2015 CAF Confederation Cup	Continental	(Tunisia) Étoile du Sahel
14–15	Luge	(Latvia) 2015 FIL World Luge Championships	International	Germany
14–29 March	Cricket	(Australia) / (New Zealand) 2015 Cricket World Cup	International	Australia
15	Basketball	(United States) 2015 NBA All-Star Game	Domestic	Game winners: Western Conference; Shooting Stars Competition winners: Team Bosh (Texas) Chris Bosh ( (Florida) Miami Heat), (Pennsylvania) Swin Cash ( (New York (state)) New York Liberty), and (France) Dominique Wilkins (retired); Skills Challenge winner: (Illinois) Patrick Beverley ( (Texas) Houston Rockets); Three-Point Contest winner: (Ohio) Stephen Curry ( (California) Golden State Warriors); Slam Dunk Contest winner: (Washington (state)) Zach LaVine ( Minnesota Timberwolves)
15–1 March	Association football	(Niger) 2015 African U-17 Championship	Continental	Mali
16–22	Snooker	(Wales) 2015 Welsh Open	International	(Scotland) John Higgins
17–24	Biathlon	(Belarus) 2015 IBU Youth/Junior World Championships	International	Russia
18–21	Ice hockey	(Hong Kong) 2015 IIHF Women's World Championship Division II – Group B Qualification	International	Turkey is promoted to Division II Group B
18–22	Track cycling	(France) 2015 UCI Track Cycling World Championships	International	France
18–1 March	Nordic skiing	(Sweden) FIS Nordic World Ski Championships 2015	International	Norway
20–22	Speed skating	(Poland) 2015 World Junior Speed Skating Championships	International	Netherlands
20–20 November	Motorsport	(United States) 2015 NASCAR Camping World Truck Series	Domestic	Champion: (Michigan) Erik Jones; Manufacturer: (Japan) Toyota
21	Association football	(Algeria) 2015 CAF Super Cup	Continental	(Algeria) ES Sétif
21	Triathlon	(Australia) 2015 OTU Triathlon Oceania Championships	Continental	Men: (Australia) Jacob Birtwhistle; Women: (Australia) Jaz Hedgeland
21	Ice hockey	(United States) 2015 NHL Stadium Series	Domestic	(California) Los Angeles Kings
21–21 November	Motorsport	(United States) 2015 NASCAR Xfinity Series	Domestic	Champion: (Texas) Chris Buescher; Manufacturer: (United States) Chevrolet
22	Marathon	(Japan) 2015 Tokyo Marathon (WMM #1)	International	Men: (Ethiopia) Endeshaw Negesse; Women: (Ethiopia) Berhane Dibaba
22	NASCAR	(United States) 2015 Daytona 500	Domestic	(Connecticut) Joey Logano ( (North Carolina) Team Penske)
22–22 November	Motorsport	(United States) 2015 NASCAR Sprint Cup Series	Domestic	Champion: (Nevada) Kyle Busch; Manufacturer: (United States) Chevrolet
23–8 March	Bobsleigh and Skeleton	(Germany) FIBT World Championships 2015	International	Germany
27–1 March	Speed skating	(Japan) 2015 World Junior Short Track Speed Skating Championships	International	South Korea
27–15 March	Association football	(Honduras) 2015 CONCACAF U-17 Championship	Continental	Mexico
28–1 March	Luge	(Russia) 2015 FIL European Luge Championships	Continental	Men: (Russia) Semen Pavlichenko; Women: (Germany) Dajana Eitberger; Men's Doubles: (Germany) Tobias Wendl / Tobias Arlt; Team Relay: (Germany) Dajana Eitberger / Felix Loch / Tobias Wendl and Tobias Arlt
28–1 March	Speed skating	(Kazakhstan) 2015 World Sprint Speed Skating Championships	International	Overall Men's winner: (Russia) Pavel Kulizhnikov; Overall Women's winner: Brittany Bowe; Medal tally: United States
28–8 March	Curling	(Estonia) 2015 World Junior Curling Championships	International	Men: Canada (Skip: Braden Calvert); Women: Canada (Skip: Kelsey Rocque)

=== March ===
Date	Sport	Venue/Event	Status	Winner/s
1–10	Alpine skiing	(Canada) 2015 IPC Alpine Skiing World Championships	International	Russia
2–8	Figure skating	(Estonia) 2015 World Junior Figure Skating Championships	International	Men: (Japan) Shoma Uno; Ladies: (Russia) Evgenia Medvedeva; Pairs: (China) Yu Xiaoyu / Jin Yang; Ice dance: (Russia) Anna Yanovskaya / Sergey Mozgov
3–15	Biathlon	(Finland) Biathlon World Championships 2015	International	France and Germany (three gold medals each)
4–29	Association football	(Paraguay) 2015 South American Under-17 Football Championship	Continental	Brazil
5–8	Golf	(United States) 2015 WGC-Cadillac Championship	International	(United States) Dustin Johnson
5–4 October	Rugby league	(Australia) 2015 NRL season	Continental	North Queensland Cowboys
6–7	Triathlon	(United Arab Emirates) World Triathlon Series #1	International	Men: (Spain) Mario Mola; Women: (United States) Gwen Jorgensen
6–8	Athletics	(Czech Republic) 2015 European Athletics Indoor Championships	Continental	Russia
6–25 October	Association football	(United States) 2015 Major League Soccer season	Domestic	Eastern Conference (MLS): (United States) New York Red Bulls; Western Conference (MLS): (United States) FC Dallas; Supporters' Shield: New York Red Bulls
6–29 November	Tennis	2015 Davis Cup	International	Great Britain
7–8	Speed skating	(Canada) 2015 World Allround Speed Skating Championships	International	Men: (Netherlands) Sven Kramer; Women: (Czech Republic) Martina Sáblíková
7–13	Ice hockey	(Spain) 2015 IIHF Women's World Championship Division II – Group B	International	Slovenia is promoted to Division II Group A Belgium is relegated to Division II Group B Qualification
8–22	Association football	(Senegal) 2015 African U-20 Championship	Continental	Nigeria
9–22	Tennis	(United States) 2015 BNP Paribas Open	International	Men: (Serbia) Novak Djokovic; Women: (Romania) Simona Halep
10–14	Snooker	(India) 2015 Indian Open	International	(Wales) Michael White
13–15	Speed skating	(Russia) 2015 World Short Track Speed Skating Championships	International	South Korea
14–15	Triathlon	(Australia) Triathlon World Cup #1	International	Men: (France) David Hauss; Women: (Spain) Tamara Gómez Garrido
14–22	Curling	(Japan) 2015 World Women's Curling Championship	International	Switzerland (Skip: Alina Pätz)
15	Formula One	(Australia) 2015 Australian Grand Prix	International	(United Kingdom) Lewis Hamilton ( (Germany) Mercedes)
15–22	Ice hockey	(Serbia) 2015 IIHF World U18 Championship Division II – Group B	International	Romania is promoted to Division II Group A Australia is relegated to Division III Group A
17–19	Ice hockey	(New Zealand) 2015 IIHF World U18 Championship Division III – Group B	International	Turkey is promoted to Division III – Group A
17–6 April	Basketball	(United States) 2015 NCAA Division I Men's Basketball Tournament	Domestic	(North Carolina) Duke Blue Devils
20–22	Amateur wrestling	(Marshall Islands) 2015 Oceania Wrestling Championships	Regional	Marshall Islands
20–7 April	Basketball	(United States) 2015 NCAA Division I Women's Basketball Tournament	Domestic	Connecticut Huskies
21–22	Triathlon	(New Zealand) Triathlon World Cup #2	International	Men: (South Africa) Richard Murray; Women: (United States) Kaitlin Donner
22–28	Ice hockey	(Estonia) 2015 IIHF World U18 Championship Division II – Group A	International	South Korea is promoted to Division I Group B Estonia is relegated to Division II Group B
22–28	Ice hockey	(Chinese Taipei) 2015 IIHF World U18 Championship Division III – Group A	International	Iceland is promoted to Division II Group B South Africa is relegated to Division III Group B
23–29	Figure skating	(China) 2015 World Figure Skating Championships	International	Men: (Spain) Javier Fernández; Ladies: (Russia) Elizaveta Tuktamysheva; Pairs: (Canada) Meagan Duhamel / Eric Radford; Ice Dance: (France) Gabriella Papadakis / Guillaume Cizeron
24–5 April	Tennis	(United States) 2015 Miami Open	International	Men: (Serbia) Novak Djokovic; Women: (United States) Serena Williams
26–29	Track cycling	(Netherlands) 2015 UCI Para-cycling Track World Championships	International	Men: China; Women: China and Great Britain (3 gold medals each)
28	Athletics	(China) 2015 IAAF World Cross Country Championships	International	Ethiopia
28–29	Triathlon	(New Zealand) 2015 World Triathlon Series #2	International	Men: (United Kingdom) Jonathan Brownlee; Women: (United States) Gwen Jorgensen
28–4 April	Ice hockey	(Sweden) 2015 IIHF Women's World Championship	International	United States
28–5 April	Multi-sport	(Russia) 2015 Winter Deaflympics	International	Russia
28–5 April	Curling	(Canada) 2015 Ford World Men's Curling Championship	International	Sweden (Skip: Niklas Edin)
28–5 April	Squash	(Czech Republic) 2015 European Junior Squash Championships	Continental	Men: George Parker; Women: Georgina Kennedy; Team: England
29–4 April	Bandy	(Russia) 2015 Bandy World Championship	International	Russia
29	Formula One	(Malaysia) 2015 Malaysian Grand Prix	International	(Germany) Sebastian Vettel ( (Italy) Ferrari)
29	Motorcycle racing	Qatar motorcycle Grand Prix	International	MotoGP: (Italy) Valentino Rossi ( (Japan) Yamaha); Moto2: (Germany) Jonas Folger ( (Spain) AGR Team); Moto3: (France) Alexis Masbou ( (Germany) SaxoPrint–RTG)
29–30 August	IndyCar	(United States) / (Canada) 2015 IndyCar Series season	International	(New Zealand) Scott Dixon
30–5 April	Snooker	2015 China Open	International	(England) Mark Selby
30–5 April	Ice hockey	(United Kingdom) 2015 IIHF Women's World Championship Division II – Group A	International	Kazakhstan is promoted to Division I Group B New Zealand is relegated to Division II Group B

=== April ===
Date	Sport	Venue/Event	Status	Winner/s
2–5	Golf	(United States) 2015 ANA Inspiration	International	(United States) Brittany Lincicome
3–12	Ice hockey	(Turkey) 2015 IIHF World Championship Division III	International	North Korea is promoted to Division II Group B
5–4 October	Baseball	(United States) / (Canada) 2015 Major League Baseball season	Domestic	American League: (Missouri) Kansas City Royals; American League MVP: (Florida) Josh Donaldson ( (Ontario) Toronto Blue Jays); National League: (Missouri) St. Louis Cardinals; National League MVP: (Nevada) Bryce Harper ( (Washington, D.C.) Washington Nationals)
6–12	Ice hockey	(China) 2015 IIHF Women's World Championship Division I – Group B	International	Slovakia is promoted to Division I Group A North Korea is relegated to Division II Group A
8–24 May	Cricket	(India) 2015 Indian Premier League	Domestic	(India) Mumbai Indians
9–11	Wrestling	(United States) 2015 Wrestling World Cup	International	Iran
9 & 11	Ice hockey	(United States) 2015 NCAA Division I Men's Ice Hockey Tournament Frozen Four	Domestic	(Rhode Island) Providence Friars
9–12	Golf	(United States) 2015 Masters Tournament	International	(United States) Jordan Spieth
9–18	Weightlifting	(Georgia (country)) 2015 European Weightlifting Championships	Continental	Ukraine
8 October 2014–11	Ice hockey	(United States) / (Canada) 2014–15 NHL season	Domestic	Presidents' Trophy: (New York (state)) New York Rangers; MVP: (British Columbia) Carey Price ( (Quebec) Montreal Canadiens); Top scorer: (British Columbia) Jamie Benn ( (Texas) Dallas Stars)
11–12	Triathlon	(Australia) 2015 World Triathlon Series #3	International	Men: (United Kingdom) Jonathan Brownlee; Women: (United States) Gwen Jorgensen
12	Motorcycle racing	(United States) Motorcycle Grand Prix of the Americas	International	MotoGP: (Spain) Marc Márquez ( (Japan) Repsol Honda); Moto2: (United Kingdom) Sam Lowes ( (Italy) Speed Up); Moto3: (United Kingdom) Danny Kent ( (Germany) Leopard Racing)
12	Formula One	(China) 2015 Chinese Grand Prix	International	(United Kingdom) Lewis Hamilton ( (Germany) Mercedes)
12–18	Ice hockey	(Hungary) / (Slovenia) 2015 IIHF World U18 Championship Division I	International	Denmark is promoted to the Top Division; Hungary is relegated to Division I Group B Austria is promoted to Division I Group A Lithuania is relegated to Division II Group A
12–18	Ice hockey	(France) 2015 IIHF Women's World Championship Division I – Group A	International	Czech Republic is promoted to the Top Division; Latvia is relegated to Division I Group B
12–19	Tennis	(Monaco) 2015 Monte-Carlo Rolex Masters	International	(Serbia) Novak Djokovic
12–21 November	Motorsport	(European Union) / (United States) / (Japan) / (China) / (Bahrain) 2015 FIA World Endurance Championship season	International	LMP1: (Germany) Timo Bernhard, (Australia) Mark Webber, and (New Zealand) Brendon Hartley ( (Germany) Porsche); LMP2: (Russia) Roman Rusinov, (France) Julien Canal, and (United Kingdom) Sam Bird ( (France) OAK Racing); LMGTE Pro: (Austria) Richard Lietz and (Denmark) Michael Christensen ( (Germany) Porsche); LMGTE Am: (Russia) Viktor Shaitar, (Russia) Aleksey Basov, and (Italy) Andrea Bertolini ( (Italy) AF Corse)
13	Association football	(Switzerland) 2014–15 UEFA Youth League Final	Continental	(England) Chelsea
13–18	Ice hockey	(Canada) 2015 Allan Cup	Domestic	(Manitoba) South East Prairie Thunder
13–19	Artistic gymnastics	(France) 2015 European Artistic Gymnastics Championships	Continental	Overall: Russia; Men: Great Britain; Women: Russia
13–19	Ice hockey	(Netherlands) 2015 IIHF World Championship Division I – Group B	International	South Korea is promoted to Division I Group A Netherlands is relegated to Division II Group A
13–19	Ice hockey	(Iceland) / (South Africa) 2015 IIHF World Championship Division II	International	Romania is promoted to Division I Group B Australia is relegated to Division II Group B China is promoted to Division II Group A South Africa is relegated to Division III
28 October 2014–15	Basketball	(United States) / (Canada) 2014–15 NBA season	Domestic	Season's Top Seed: (California) Golden State Warriors; Season MVP: (North Carolina) Stephen Curry ( (California) Golden State Warriors); Top Scorer: (California) Russell Westbrook ( Oklahoma City Thunder)
15–15 June	Ice hockey	(Canada) / (United States) 2015 Stanley Cup playoffs	Domestic	(Illinois) Chicago Blackhawks; Playoffs MVP: (Manitoba) Duncan Keith ( (Illinois) Chicago Blackhawks)
16	Basketball	(United States) 2015 WNBA draft	Domestic	#1 pick: (Illinois) Jewell Loyd, (Indiana) University of Notre Dame ( (Washington (state)) Seattle Storm)
16–19	Figure skating	(Japan) 2015 ISU World Team Trophy in Figure Skating	International	United States
16–26	Ice hockey	(Switzerland) 2015 IIHF World U18 Championships	International	United States
17–26	Fencing	(Chile) 2015 Pan American Fencing Championships	Continental	United States
18–25	Curling	(Russia) 2015 World Mixed Doubles Curling Championship	International	(Hungary) Dorottya Palancsa / Zsolt Kiss
18–25	Curling	(Russia) 2015 World Senior Curling Championships	International	Men: United States (Skip: Lyle Sieg); Women: Canada (Skip: Lois Fowler)
18–16 June	Basketball	(United States) / (Canada) 2015 NBA Playoffs	Domestic	(California) Golden State Warriors; Finals MVP: (Illinois) Andre Iguodala ( (California) Golden State Warriors)
19	Formula One	2015 Bahrain Grand Prix	International	(United Kingdom) Lewis Hamilton ( (Germany) Mercedes)
19	Motorcycle racing	(Argentina) Argentine motorcycle Grand Prix	International	MotoGP: (Italy) Valentino Rossi ( (Japan) Yamaha Motor Racing); Moto2: (France) Johann Zarco ( (Finland) Ajo Motorsport); Moto3: (United Kingdom) Danny Kent ( (Germany) Leopard Racing)
19–25	Ice hockey	(Poland) 2015 IIHF World Championship Division I – Group A	International	Kazakhstan and Hungary are promoted to Top Division; Ukraine is relegated to Division I Group B
20	Marathon	(United States) 2015 Boston Marathon (WMM #2)	International	Men: (Ethiopia) Lelisa Desisa; Women: (Kenya) Caroline Rotich
24–26	Judo	(Canada) 2015 Pan American Judo Championships	Continental	Brazil
24–26	Amateur wrestling	(Chile) 2015 Pan American Wrestling Championships	Continental	Men's Freestyle: United States; Women's Freestyle: Canada, Cuba, and the United States (2 gold medals each); Greco-Roman: Cuba
24–3 May	Sledge hockey	(United States) 2015 IPC Ice Sledge Hockey World Championships	International	United States
25–26	Triathlon	(South Africa) 2015 World Triathlon Series #4	International	Men: (United Kingdom) Alistair Brownlee; Women: (United Kingdom) Vicky Holland
25–29	Powerlifting	(Mexico) 2015 IPC Powerlifting Americas Open Championships	Continental	Mexico
7 October 2014–26	Association football	2014–15 OFC Champions League	Continental	(New Zealand) Auckland City
26	Marathon	(United Kingdom) 2015 London Marathon (WMM #3)	International	Men: (Kenya) Eliud Kipchoge; Women: (Ethiopia) Tigist Tufa
26–3 May	Table tennis	(China) 2015 World Table Tennis Championships	International	China
5 August 2014–29	Association football	2014–15 CONCACAF Champions League	Continental	(Mexico) Club América
29–3 May	Golf	(United States) 2015 WGC-Cadillac Match Play	International	(Northern Ireland) Rory McIlroy
29–3 May	Rhythmic gymnastics	(Belarus) 2015 Rhythmic Gymnastics European Championships	Continental	Russia
30–2 May	American football	(United States) 2015 NFL Draft	Domestic	#1 pick: (Alabama) Jameis Winston, Florida State University ( Tampa Bay Buccaneers)

=== May ===
Date	Sport	Venue/Event	Status	Winner/s
1	Athletics	(China) 2015 IAAF Race Walking Challenge	International	Men: (China) Chen Ding; Women: (China) DUAN Dandan
1–17	Ice hockey	(Czech Republic) 2015 IIHF World Championship	International	Canada
2	Horse racing	(United Kingdom) 2015 2000 Guineas Stakes	Domestic	Horse: (Republic of Ireland) Gleneagles; Jockey: (United Kingdom) Ryan Moore; Trainer: (Republic of Ireland) Aidan O'Brien
2	Horse racing	(United States) 2015 Kentucky Derby	Domestic	Horse: (United States) American Pharoah; Jockey: (Mexico) Victor Espinoza; Trainer: (United States) Bob Baffert
2	Rugby union	(England) 2015 European Rugby Champions Cup Final	Continental	(France) Toulon
2–3	Athletics	(The Bahamas) 2015 IAAF World Relays	International	United States
3	Motorcycle racing	(Spain) Spanish motorcycle Grand Prix	International	MotoGP: (Spain) Jorge Lorenzo ( (Japan) Movistar Yamaha MotoGP); Moto2: (Germany) Jonas Folger ( (Spain) AGR Team); Moto3: (United Kingdom) Danny Kent ( (Germany) Leopard Racing)
3	Road running	Wings for Life World Run 2015	International	(Austria) Lemawork Ketema (Japan) Yuuko Watanabe
3–10	Tennis	(Spain) 2015 Mutua Madrid Open	International	Men: (United Kingdom) Andy Murray; Women: (Czech Republic) Petra Kvitová
6–10	Volleyball	(Switzerland) 2015 FIVB Volleyball Women's Club World Championship	International	(Turkey) Eczacıbaşı VitrA
6–10	Amateur wrestling	(Qatar) 2015 Asian Wrestling Championships	Continental	Men's Freestyle: Iran; Men's Greco-Roman: Iran; Women's Freestyle: Japan; Overall winners: Iran
6–22	Association football	(Bulgaria) 2015 UEFA European Under-17 Championship	Continental	France
7–10	Golf	(United States) 2015 Players Championship	International	(United States) Rickie Fowler
8–18	Multi-sport	(South Korea) 2015 IBSA World Championships and Games	International	Russia
9–10	Triathlon	(China) Triathlon World Cup #3	International	Men: (Australia) Ryan Fisher; Women: (United States) Renee Tomlin
9–31	Road Cycling	(Italy) 2015 Giro d'Italia	International	(Spain) Alberto Contador ( (Russia) Tinkoff-Saxo)
11–17	Tennis	(Italy) 2015 Internazionali BNL d'Italia	International	Men: (Serbia) Novak Djokovic; Women: (Russia) Maria Sharapova
10	Formula One	(Spain) 2015 Spanish Grand Prix	International	(Germany) Nico Rosberg ( (Germany) Mercedes)
14	Association football	(Germany) 2015 UEFA Women's Champions League Final	Continental	(Germany) Frankfurt
12–18	Taekwondo	(Russia) 2015 World Taekwondo Championships	International	Men: Iran; Women: South Korea
12–20	Volleyball	(Myanmar) 2015 Asian Men's U23 Volleyball Championship	Continental	Iran
14–17	Golf	(United States) The Tradition	International	(United States) Jeff Maggert
14–24	Amateur boxing	(Chinese Taipei) 2015 Women's Junior/Youth World Boxing Championships	International	Junior: Russia; Youth: Russia
15	Athletics	Qatar Athletic Super Grand Prix	International	United States
15–24	Amateur boxing	(Ukraine) 2015 EUBC European Confederation Junior Boxing Championships	Continental	Ukraine
16	Horse racing	(United States) 2015 Preakness Stakes	Domestic	Horse: (United States) American Pharoah; Jockey: (Mexico) Victor Espinoza; Trainer: (United States) Bob Baffert
16–17	Triathlon	(Japan) 2015 World Triathlon Series #5	International	Men: (Spain) Javier Gómez Noya; Women: (United States) Gwen Jorgensen
16–17	Air racing	(Japan) Red Bull Air Race World Championship – Chiba	International	Master Class: (United Kingdom) Paul Bonhomme (Aircraft: Zivko Edge 540 from (United States) Zivko Aeronautics); Challenger Class: (Czech Republic) Petr Kopstein (Aircraft: Extra 330LX from (Germany) Extra Flugzeugbau)
17	Athletics	(China) Shanghai Golden Grand Prix	International	Kenya
17	Motorcycle racing	(France) French motorcycle Grand Prix	International	MotoGP: (Spain) Jorge Lorenzo ( (Japan) Movistar Yamaha MotoGP); Moto2: (Switzerland) Thomas Lüthi ( (Switzerland) Derendinger Racing Interwetten); Moto3: (Italy) Romano Fenati ( (Italy) Sky Racing Team by VR46)
17–19 September	Motorsport	(Canada) 2015 NASCAR Canadian Tire Series season	Domestic	(Ontario) Scott Steckly
21–24	Golf	(United States) Senior PGA Championship	International	(Scotland) Colin Montgomerie
21–24	Golf	(England) 2015 BMW PGA Championship	International	(South Korea) An Byeong-hun
22–31	Ice hockey	(Canada) 2015 Memorial Cup	Domestic	(Ontario) Oshawa Generals
23–24	Rowing	(Czech Republic) 2015 European Rowing Junior Championships	Continental	Italy
24	Formula One	2015 Monaco Grand Prix	International	(Germany) Nico Rosberg ( (Germany) Mercedes)
24	IndyCar	(United States) 2015 Indianapolis 500	Domestic	(Colombia) Juan Pablo Montoya ( (United States) Team Penske)
24–7 June	Tennis	(France) 2015 French Open	International	Men: (Switzerland) Stan Wawrinka; Women: (United States) Serena Williams
27	Association football	(Poland) 2015 UEFA Europa League Final	Continental	(Spain) Sevilla
27–30	Squash	(Slovakia) 2015 European Squash Individual Championships	Continental	Men: (France) Grégory Gaultier; Women: (France) Camille Serme
27–31	Amateur wrestling	(Egypt) 2015 African Wrestling Championships	Continental	Men's Freestyle: Egypt; Women's Freestyle: Tunisia; Greco-Roman: Egypt
29–31	Rowing	(Poland) 2015 European Rowing Championships	Continental	(United Kingdom) Great Britain
30	Athletics	(United States) Prefontaine Classic	International	United States
30–31	Air racing	(Croatia) Red Bull Air Race World Championship – Rovinj	International	Master Class: (Austria) Hannes Arch (Aircraft: Zivko Edge 540 from (United States) Zivko Aeronautics); Challenger Class: (Sweden) Daniel Ryfa (Aircraft: Extra 330LX from (Germany) Extra Aircraft)
30–31	Triathlon	(United Kingdom) 2015 World Triathlon Series #6	International	Men: (United Kingdom) Alistair Brownlee; Women: (United States) Gwen Jorgensen
30–20 June	Association football	(New Zealand) 2015 FIFA U-20 World Cup	International	Serbia
31	Motorcycle racing	(Italy) Italian motorcycle Grand Prix	International	MotoGP: (Spain) Jorge Lorenzo ( (Japan) Movistar Yamaha MotoGP); Moto2: (Spain) Esteve Rabat ( (Belgium) EG 0,0 Marc VDS); Moto3: (Portugal) Miguel Oliveira ( (Finland) Red Bull KTM Ajo)

=== June ===
Date	Sport	Venue/Event	Status	Winner/s
1–6	Multi-sport	(Iceland) 2015 Games of the Small States of Europe	International	Iceland
2–20	Rugby union	(Italy) 2015 World Rugby Under 20 Championship	International	New Zealand
4	Athletics	(Italy) Golden Gala	International	United States
4–7	3x3 (basketball)	(Hungary) 2015 FIBA 3x3 U18 World Championships	International	Men: New Zealand; Women: France
5–16	Multi-sport	(Singapore) 2015 Southeast Asian Games	International	Thailand
5–13 September	Basketball	(United States) 2015 WNBA season	Domestic	Eastern Conference (WNBA): (New York (state)) New York Liberty; Western Conference (WNBA): Minnesota Lynx
6	Association football	(Germany) 2015 UEFA Champions League Final	Continental	(Spain) Barcelona
6	Horse racing	(United Kingdom) 2015 Epsom Derby	Domestic	Horse: (United Kingdom) Golden Horn; Jockey: (Italy) Frankie Dettori; Trainer: (United Kingdom) John Gosden
6	Horse racing	(United States) 2015 Belmont Stakes	Domestic	Horse: (United States) American Pharoah; Jockey: (Mexico) Victor Espinoza; Trainer: (United States) Bob Baffert; Triple Crown winner
6–11	Fencing	(Switzerland) 2015 European Fencing Championships	Continental	Italy, Russia, and France (3 gold medals); Overall: Italy
6–14	Weightlifting	(Poland) 2015 Junior World Weightlifting Championships	International	China
6–5 July	Association football	(Canada) 2015 FIFA Women's World Cup	International	United States
7	Athletics	(United Kingdom) British Grand Prix (Birmingham)	International	Kenya
7	Formula One	(Canada) 2015 Canadian Grand Prix	International	(United Kingdom) Lewis Hamilton ( (Germany) Mercedes)
7–14	Amateur boxing	(Uzbekistan) 2015 ASBC Asian Confederation Junior Boxing Championships	Continental	Uzbekistan
8–10	Baseball	(United States) 2015 Major League Baseball draft	Domestic	#1 pick: (Georgia (U.S. state)) Dansby Swanson (to the Arizona Diamondbacks from (Tennessee) Vanderbilt)
8–14	Archery	(United States) 2015 World Archery Youth Championships	International	South Korea
9–14	Water polo	(China) 2015 FINA Women's Water Polo World League	International	United States
11	Athletics	(Norway) Bislett Games	International	Kenya
11–14	Golf	(United States) Senior Players Championship	International	(Germany) Bernhard Langer
11–14	Golf	(United States) 2015 KPMG Women's PGA Championship	International	(South Korea) Inbee Park
11–16	Fencing	(Egypt) 2015 African Fencing Championships	Continental	Tunisia
11–28	Basketball	(Hungary) / (Romania) EuroBasket Women 2015	Continental	Serbia
11–4 July	Association football	(Chile) 2015 Copa América	Continental	Chile
12–28	Multi-sport	(Azerbaijan) 2015 European Games	Continental	Russia
13	Athletics	(United States) Adidas Grand Prix	International	United States
13–29	Association football	(United Kingdom) 2015 CPISRA Football 7-a-side World Championships	International	Russia
14	Motorcycle racing	(Spain) Catalan motorcycle Grand Prix	International	MotoGP: (Spain) Jorge Lorenzo ( (Japan) Movistar Yamaha MotoGP); Moto2: (France) Johann Zarco ( (Finland) Ajo Motorsport); Moto3: (United Kingdom) Danny Kent ( (Germany) Leopard Racing)
14	Triathlon	(Mexico) Triathlon World Cup #4	International	Men: (Mexico) Irving Perez; Women: (Chile) Valentina Carvallo
17–30	Association football	(Czech Republic) 2015 UEFA European Under-21 Championship	Continental	Sweden
18–21	Golf	(United States) U.S. Open	International	(United States) Jordan Spieth
20–26 July	Twenty20	(Cricket West Indies) 2015 Caribbean Premier League	Regional	Trinidad and Tobago Red Steel
21	Formula One	(Austria) 2015 Austrian Grand Prix	International	(Germany) Nico Rosberg ( (Germany) Mercedes)
22–4 July	Association football	(Iceland) 2015 UEFA Women's Under-17 Championship	Continental	Spain
23–28	Water polo	(Italy) 2015 FINA Men's Water Polo World League Super Final	International	Serbia
25	Basketball	(United States) 2015 NBA draft	International	#1: (New Jersey) Karl-Anthony Towns (to the Minnesota Timberwolves from the University of Kentucky)
25–28	Golf	(United States) U.S. Senior Open	International	(United States) Jeff Maggert
26–27	Ice hockey	(United States) 2015 NHL entry draft	International	#1 pick: (Ontario) Connor McDavid (to the (Alberta) Edmonton Oilers from the (Pennsylvania) Erie Otters)
26–5 July	Multi-sport	(United States) 2015 World Police and Fire Games	International	United States
26–5 July	Beach volleyball	(Netherlands) 2015 Beach Volleyball World Championships	International	Men: (Brazil) Alison–Bruno; Women: (Brazil) Bárbara–Ágatha
27	Motorcycle racing	(Netherlands) Dutch TT	International	MotoGP: (Italy) Valentino Rossi ( (Japan) Movistar Yamaha MotoGP); Moto2: (France) Johann Zarco ( (Finland) Ajo Motorsport); Moto3: (Portugal) Miguel Oliveira ( (Finland) Ajo Motorsport)
27	Mountain bike racing	(Italy) 2015 UCI Mountain Bike Marathon World Championships	International	Men: (Austria) Alban Lakata; Women: (Norway) Gunn-Rita Dahle Flesjå
27	Triathlon	(Germany) 2015 ETU Aquathlon European Championships	Continental	Men: (Czech Republic) Tomáš Svoboda; Women: (United Kingdom) Hannah Kitchen
27	Triathlon	(Sweden) 2015 ITU Long Distance Triathlon World Championships	International	Men: (France) Cyril Viennot; Women: (United States) Mary Beth Ellis
27–3 July	Multi-sport	(Jersey) 2015 Island Games	International	Jersey
27–5 July	Basketball	(Greece) 2015 FIBA Under-19 World Championship	International	United States
29–12 July	Tennis	(United Kingdom) 2015 Wimbledon Championships	International	Men: (Serbia) Novak Djokovic; Women: (United States) Serena Williams

=== July ===
Date	Sport	Venue/Event	Status	Winner/s
2–8	Multi-sport	(Netherlands) 2015 IWAS World Junior Games	International	Results: click here.
3–14	Multi-sport	(South Korea) 2015 Summer Universiade	International	South Korea
4	Association football	(Republic of Ireland) 2015 UEFA Regions' Cup Final	Continental	(Republic of Ireland) Irish Eastern Region
4	Athletics	(France) Meeting Areva	International	Kenya
4–5	Air racing	(Hungary) Red Bull Air Race World Championship – Budapest	International	Master Class: (Austria) Hannes Arch (Aircraft: Zivko Edge 540 from (United States) Zivko Aeronautics); Challenger Class: (Sweden) Daniel Ryfa (Aircraft: Extra 330LX from (Germany) Extra Aircraft)
4–18	Multi-sport	(Papua New Guinea) 2015 Pacific Games	Continental	Papua New Guinea
4–26	Road bicycle racing	2015 Tour de France	International	(United Kingdom) Chris Froome ( (United Kingdom) Team Sky)
5	Formula One	(United Kingdom) 2015 British Grand Prix	International	(United Kingdom) Lewis Hamilton ( (Germany) Mercedes)
6–19	Association football	(Greece) 2015 UEFA European Under-19 Championship	Continental	Spain
7–26	Association football	(Canada) / (United States) 2015 CONCACAF Gold Cup	Continental	Mexico
8–24 August	Cricket	(Wales) / (England) 2015 Ashes series	International	England
8–18	American football	(United States) 2015 IFAF World Championship	International	United States
9	Athletics	(Switzerland) Athletissima	International	United States
9–12	Golf	(United States) 2015 U.S. Women's Open	International	(South Korea) Chun In-gee
9–12	Triathlon	(Switzerland) 2015 European Triathlon Championships	Continental	Men: (France) David Hauss; Women: (Switzerland) Nicola Spirig
9–19	Beach soccer	(Portugal) 2015 FIFA Beach Soccer World Cup	International	Portugal
10–26	Multi-sport	(Canada) 2015 Pan American Games	Continental	United States
12	Motorcycle racing	(Germany) German motorcycle Grand Prix	International	MotoGP: (Spain) Marc Márquez ( (Japan) Repsol Honda Team); Moto2: (Belgium) Xavier Siméon ( (Italy) Gresini Racing); Moto3: (United Kingdom) Danny Kent ( (Germany) Leopard Racing)
13–19	Fencing	(Russia) 2015 World Fencing Championships	International	Russia and Italy (4 gold medals); Overall: Russia
13–19	Swimming	(United Kingdom) 2015 IPC Swimming World Championships	International	Russia
14	Baseball	(United States) 2015 Major League Baseball All-Star Game	Domestic	All-Star Game: American League; Home Run Derby: (New Jersey) Todd Frazier ( (Ohio) Cincinnati Reds)
15–19	Volleyball	(Brazil) 2015 FIVB Volleyball World League final rounds	International	France
15–19	Athletics	(Colombia) 2015 World Youth Championships in Athletics	International	United States
15–27	Association football	(Israel) 2015 UEFA Women's Under-19 Championship	Continental	Sweden
16–20	Golf	(Scotland) 2015 Open Championship	International	(United States) Zach Johnson
17	Athletics	(Monaco) Herculis	International	United States
18–19	Triathlon	(Germany) 2015 World Triathlon Series #7	International	Men: (France) Vincent Luis; Women: (United States) Gwen Jorgensen
18–19	Triathlon	(Germany) 2015 ITU Triathlon Mixed Relay World Championships	International	France
18–26	Basketball	(Russia) 2015 FIBA Under-19 World Championship for Women	International	United States
19–1 August	Handball	(Brazil) 2015 Men's Junior World Handball Championship	International	France
21–25	BMX racing	(Belgium) 2015 UCI BMX World Championships	International	Men: (Netherlands) Niek Kimmann; Women: (Venezuela) Stefany Hernández
22–26	Volleyball	(United States) 2015 FIVB Volleyball World Grand Prix final rounds	International	United States
22–26	Rowing	(Bulgaria) 2015 World Rowing U23 Championships	International	Italy
23–26	Golf	(England) Senior Open Championship	International	(United States) Marco Dawson
24–25	Athletics	(United Kingdom) London Grand Prix	International	United States
24–2 August	Baseball	(Chinese Taipei) 12U Baseball World Cup	International	United States
24–9 August	Aquatics	(Russia) 2015 World Aquatics Championships	International	China
25–2 August	Multi-sport	(United States) 2015 Special Olympics World Summer Games	International	For results, click here.
26	Formula One	(Hungary) 2015 Hungarian Grand Prix	International	(Germany) Sebastian Vettel ( (Italy) Ferrari)
26–30	Powerlifting	(Kazakhstan) 2015 IPC Powerlifting Asian Open Championships	Continental	China
26–2 August	Multi-sport events	(Georgia (country)) 2015 European Youth Summer Olympic Festival	International	Russia
26–2 August	Archery	(Denmark) 2015 World Archery Championships	International	South Korea
28–2 August	Beach volleyball	(Austria) 2015 European Beach Volleyball Championships	Continental	Men: (Latvia) Samoilovs–Šmēdiņš; Women: (Germany) Ludwig–Walkenhorst
30	Athletics	(Sweden) DN Galan	International	United States
30–2 August	Golf	(Scotland) 2015 Women's British Open	International	(South Korea) Inbee Park

=== August ===
Date	Sport	Venue/Event	Status	Winner/s
1–9	Multi-sport	(France) 2015 Indian Ocean Island Games	International	(France) Réunion
3–8	Radio-controlled 1:10 off-road	(United Kingdom) 2015 EFRA European 1:10 Off-Road Championship	Continental	2WD: (United Kingdom) Lee Martin ( (Japan) Yokomo); 4WD: (Poland) Michal Orlowski ( (United Kingdom) Schumacher)
5–9	Rowing	(Brazil) 2015 World Rowing Junior Championships	International	Germany
6–9	Road cycling	(Estonia) 2015 European Road Championships (under-23 and juniors only)	Continental	Poland
6–9	Golf	(United States) 2015 WGC-Bridgestone Invitational	International	(Republic of Ireland) Shane Lowry
6–9	Judo	(Bosnia and Herzegovina) 2015 World Cadet Judo Championships	International	Japan
6–14	Amateur boxing	(China) 2015 ASBC Asian Confederation Women's Boxing Championships	Continental	China
6–15	Amateur boxing	(Bulgaria) 2015 EUBC European Confederation Boxing Championships	Continental	Russia
6–18	Masters athletics	(France) 2015 World Masters Athletics Championships	International	For results, click here.
7–9	Radio-controlled 1:10 off-road	(United States) 2015 ROAR 1:10 Off-Road National Championship	Domestic	2WD: (United States) Ryan Cavalieri ( (United States) Team Associated); 4WD: (United States) Ryan Cavalieri ( (United States) Team Associated)
7–15	Multi-sport	(Canada) 2015 Parapan American Games	International	Brazil
7–16	Multi-sport	(England) 2015 CPISRA World Games	International	England
7–16	Volleyball	(Peru) 2015 FIVB Volleyball Girls' U18 World Championship	International	Italy
7–20	Handball	(Russia) 2015 Men's Youth World Handball Championship	International	France
8–9	Triathlon	(Hungary) Triathlon World Cup #5	International	Men: (Russia) Igor Polyanski; Women: (Australia) Felicity Sheedy-Ryan
8–16	Basketball	(Canada) 2015 FIBA Americas Women's Championship	Continental	Canada
9	Motorcycle racing	(United States) Indianapolis motorcycle Grand Prix	International	MotoGP: (Spain) Marc Márquez ( (Japan) Repsol Honda Team); Moto2: (Spain) Álex Rins ( (Spain) Páginas Amarillas HP 40); Moto3: (Belgium) Livio Loi ( (Netherlands) RW Racing GP)
10–16	Tennis	(Canada) 2015 Rogers Cup	International	Men: (United Kingdom) Andy Murray; Women: (Switzerland) Belinda Bencic
10–16	Badminton	(Indonesia) 2015 BWF World Championships	International	China
11	Association football	(Georgia (country)) 2015 UEFA Super Cup	Continental	(Spain) Barcelona
11–16	Amateur wrestling	(Brazil) 2015 World Junior Wrestling Championships	International	Men's Freestyle: Azerbaijan; Women's Freestyle: Japan; Greco-Roman: Georgia; Overall: Azerbaijan
11–21	Gaelic handball	(Canada) 2015 GAA Handball World Championships	International	Men: (Republic of Ireland) Paul Brady; Women: (Northern Ireland) Aisling Reilly; Men's team: (Republic of Ireland) Robbie McCarthy and Diarmaid Nash; Women's team: (Northern Ireland) Aisling Reilly and (Republic of Ireland) Martina McMahon
11–23	Equestrian	(Germany) 2015 FEI European Equestrian Championships	Continental	For results, click here.
12–19	Volleyball	(Turkey) 2015 FIVB Volleyball Women's U23 World Championship	International	Brazil
12–9 December	Association football	2015 Copa Sudamericana	Continental	(Colombia) Santa Fe
13–16	Golf	(United States) 2015 PGA Championship	International	(Australia) Jason Day
14–23	Volleyball	(Argentina) 2015 FIVB Volleyball Boys' U19 World Championship	International	Poland
15–16	Air racing	(United Kingdom) Red Bull Air Race World Championship – Ascot	International	Master Class: (United Kingdom) Paul Bonhomme (Aircraft: Zivko Edge 540 from (United States) Zivko Aeronautics); Challenger Class: (Czech Republic) Petr Kopstein (Aircraft: Extra 330LX from (Germany) Extra Flugzeugbau)
15–23	Tennis	(United States) 2015 Western & Southern Open	International	Men: (Switzerland) Roger Federer; Women: (United States) Serena Williams
15–23	Amateur boxing	(Venezuela) 2015 AMBC American Confederation Boxing Championships	Continental	Cuba
15–23	Water polo	(Greece) 2015 FINA Junior Water Polo World Championships for Women	International	United States
15–23	Amateur boxing	(Hungary) 2015 EUBC European Confederation Women's Junior / Youth Boxing Championships	Continental	Junior: Russia; Youth: Russia
16	Motorcycle racing	Czech Republic motorcycle Grand Prix	International	MotoGP: (Spain) Jorge Lorenzo ( (Japan) Movistar Yamaha MotoGP); Moto2: (France) Johann Zarco ( (Finland) Ajo Motorsport); Moto3: (Italy) Niccolò Antonelli ( (Italy) Ongetta-Rivacold)
18–24	Amateur boxing	(Morocco) 2015 AFBC African Confederation Boxing Championships	Continental	Morocco
19–23	Canoeing	(Italy) 2015 ICF Canoe Sprint World Championships	International	Belarus
19–29	Association football	(China) 2015 AFC U-19 Women's Championship	Continental	Japan
19–30	Basketball	(Tunisia) AfroBasket 2015	Continental	Nigeria
21–23	Fistball	(Italy) 2015 European Women's Fistball Championship	Continental	Germany
22–23	Triathlon	(Sweden) 2015 World Triathlon Series #8	International	Men: (Spain) Francisco Javier Gómez Noya; Women: (United States) Sarah True
22–30	Athletics	(China) 2015 World Championships in Athletics	International	Kenya (more silver medals won than Jamaica)
22–6 September	Volleyball	(Japan) 2015 FIVB Volleyball Women's World Cup	International	China
22–13 September	Road cycling	(Spain) 2015 Vuelta a España	International	(Italy) Fabio Aru ( (Kazakhstan) Astana Pro Team)
23	Formula One	(Belgium) 2015 Belgian Grand Prix	International	(United Kingdom) Lewis Hamilton ( (Germany) Mercedes)
24–31	Volleyball	(United Arab Emirates) 2015 FIVB Volleyball Men's U23 World Championship	International	Russia
25–30	Judo	(Kazakhstan) 2015 World Judo Championships	International	Japan
25–30	Swimming	(Singapore) 2015 FINA World Junior Swimming Championships	International	Gold Medal count: Australia; Championships Trophy: United States; Men's overall ranking: (Russia) Anton Chupkov; Women's overall ranking: (Turkey) Viktoriya Zeynep Gunes; FINA Trophy: (Turkey) Viktoriya Zeynep Gunes
25–30	Amateur wrestling	(Bosnia and Herzegovina) 2015 World Cadet Wrestling Championships	International	Men's Freestyle: Russia; Women's Freestyle: Japan; Greco-Roman: Iran; Overall: Russia
26–5 September	Amateur boxing	(Thailand) 2015 ASBC Asian Confederation Boxing Championships	Continental	Kazakhstan
28–30	1:10 radio-controlled electric touring car	2015 JMRCA All-Japan 1:10 EP Touring Car Championship	Domestic	Super Expert: (Japan) Akio Sobue ( (Japan) Tamiya)
28–6 September	Baseball	(Japan) 2015 18U Baseball World Cup	International	United States
29–1 September	Amateur boxing	(Australia) 2015 OCBC Oceania Confederation Boxing Championships	Continental	Australia
29–5 September	Basketball	(China) 2015 FIBA Asia Women's Championship	Continental	Japan
30	Motorcycle racing	(United Kingdom) British motorcycle Grand Prix	International	MotoGP: (Italy) Valentino Rossi ( (Japan) Movistar Yamaha MotoGP); Moto2: (France) Johann Zarco ( (Finland) Ajo Motorsport); Moto3: (United Kingdom) Danny Kent ( (Germany) Leopard Racing)
30–6 September	Rowing	(France) 2015 World Rowing Championships	International	Great Britain (six more silver medals than New Zealand)
31–6 September	Mountain bike racing	(Andorra) 2015 UCI Mountain Bike & Trials World Championships	International	France
31–12 September	Basketball	(Mexico) 2015 FIBA Americas Championship	Continental	Venezuela
31–13 September	Tennis	(United States) 2015 US Open	International	Men: (Serbia) Novak Djokovic; Women: (Italy) Flavia Pennetta

=== September ===
Date	Sport	Venue/Event	Status	Winner/s
2–12	Amateur boxing	(Russia) 2015 Junior World Boxing Championships	International	Russia
3	Athletics	(Switzerland) Weltklasse Zürich	International	Kenya
3–12	Weightlifting	(Thailand) 2015 Asian Weightlifting Championships	Continental	China
3–12 December	American football	(United States) 2015 NCAA Division I FBS football season	Domestic	The American: (Texas) Houston Cougars; ACC: (South Carolina) Clemson Tigers; Big 12: Oklahoma Sooners; Big Ten: Michigan State Spartans; C-USA: Western Kentucky Hilltoppers; MAC: (Ohio) Bowling Green Falcons; MW: (California) San Diego State Aztecs; Pac-12: (California) Stanford Cardinal; SEC: Alabama Crimson Tide; Sun Belt: Arkansas State Red Wolves
4–12	Water polo	(Kazakhstan) 2015 FINA Junior Water Polo World Championships for Men	International	Serbia
4–19	Multi-sport	(Republic of the Congo) 2015 All-Africa Games	Continental	Egypt
5–6	Air racing	(Austria) Red Bull Air Race World Championship – Spielberg	International	Master Class: (Australia) Matt Hall (Aircraft: MXS-R from (United States) MX Aircraft); Challenger Class: (France) Mikael Brageot (Aircraft: Extra 330LX from (Germany) Extra Flugzeugbau)
5–6	Triathlon	(Canada) 2015 World Triathlon Series #9	International	Men: (South Africa) Richard Murray; Women: (United Kingdom) Vicky Holland
5–11	Multi-sport	(Samoa) 2015 Commonwealth Youth Games	International	Australia
5–20	Basketball	(Croatia) / (France) / (Germany) / (Latvia) EuroBasket 2015	Continental	Spain
6	Formula One	(Italy) 2015 Italian Grand Prix	International	(United Kingdom) Lewis Hamilton ( (Germany) Mercedes)
7–12	Wrestling	(United States) 2015 World Wrestling Championships	International	Men's freestyle: Russia (medals and points); Greco-Roman: Turkey (medals); Russia (points); Women's freestyle: Japan (medals and points); Overall: Russia
7–13	Rhythmic gymnastics	(Germany) 2015 World Rhythmic Gymnastics Championships	International	Russia
8–23	Volleyball	(Japan) 2015 FIVB Volleyball Men's World Cup	International	United States
10–13	Golf	(France) 2015 Evian Championship	International	(New Zealand) Lydia Ko
10–3 January 2016	American football	(United States) 2015 NFL season	Domestic	AFC: (Colorado) Denver Broncos; NFC: (North Carolina) Carolina Panthers
11	Athletics	(Belgium) Memorial Van Damme	International	United States
11–19	Volleyball	(Puerto Rico) 2015 FIVB Volleyball Women's U20 World Championship	International	Dominican Republic
11–20	Volleyball	(Mexico) 2015 FIVB Volleyball Men's U21 World Championship	International	Russia
12–13	Golf	(England) 2015 Walker Cup	International	Great Britain/Ireland Team
12–19	Curling	(Switzerland) 2015 World Mixed Curling Championship	International	Norway (Skip: Steffen Walstad)
13	Motorcycle racing	San Marino and Rimini's Coast motorcycle Grand Prix	International	MotoGP: (Spain) Marc Márquez ( (Japan) Repsol Honda Team); Moto2: (France) Johann Zarco ( (Finland) Ajo Motorsport); Moto3: (Italy) Enea Bastianini ( (Italy) Gresini Racing Team Moto 3)
15–19	Triathlon	(United States) 2015 World Triathlon Series Grand Final	International	Men: (Spain) Mario Mola; Women: (United States) Gwen Jorgensen
15–20	Canoeing	(United Kingdom) 2015 ICF Canoe Slalom World Championships	International	Czech Republic
16–19	Squash	(Poland) 2015 European Club Championships	Continental	Men: (Germany) Black & White Worms; Women: (France) US Créteil
18–20	Golf	(Germany) 2015 Solheim Cup	International	United States
18–31 October	Rugby union	(England) 2015 Rugby World Cup	International	New Zealand
19–27	Road cycling	(United States) 2015 UCI Road World Championships	International	United States
20	Formula One	2015 Singapore Grand Prix	International	(Germany) Sebastian Vettel ( (Italy) Ferrari)
23–3 October	Basketball	(China) 2015 FIBA Asia Championship	Continental	China
24–3 October	Basketball	(Cameroon) AfroBasket Women 2015	Continental	Senegal
26–27	Air racing	(United States) Red Bull Air Race World Championship – Fort Worth	International	Master Class: (United Kingdom) Paul Bonhomme (Aircraft: Zivko Edge 540 from (United States) Zivko Aeronautics); Challenger Class: (France) Mikael Brageot (Aircraft: Extra 330LX from (Germany) Extra Flugzeugbau)
26–27	Triathlon	(Italy) 2015 ITU Cross Triathlon World Championships	International	Men: (Spain) Rubén Ruzafa; Women: (Bermuda) Flora Duffy
26–3 October	Multi-sport	(Russia) 2015 IWAS World Games	International	Russia
26–4 October	Volleyball	(Belgium) / (Netherlands) 2015 Women's European Volleyball Championship	Continental	Russia
27	Formula One	(Japan) 2015 Japanese Grand Prix	International	(United Kingdom) Lewis Hamilton ( (Germany) Mercedes)
27	Marathon	(Germany) 2015 Berlin Marathon (WMM #4)	International	Men: (Kenya) Eliud Kipchoge; Women: (Kenya) Gladys Cherono
27	Motorcycle racing	Aragon motorcycle Grand Prix	International	MotoGP: (Spain) Jorge Lorenzo ( (Japan) Movistar Yamaha MotoGP); Moto2: (Spain) Esteve Rabat ( (Belgium) EG 0,0 Marc VDS); Moto3: (Portugal) Miguel Oliveira ( (Finland) Red Bull KTM Ajo)
27–2 October	Volleyball	(Mexico) 2015 Women's NORCECA Volleyball Championship	Continental	United States
29–3 October	Volleyball	(Colombia) 2015 Women's South American Volleyball Championship	Continental	Brazil
30–4 October	Volleyball	(Brazil) 2015 Men's South American Volleyball Championship	Continental	Brazil

=== October ===
Date	Sport	Venue/Event	Status	Winner/s
1–11	Multi-sport	(France) 2015 European Masters Games	International	For results, click here.
2–11	Multi-sport	(South Korea) 2015 Military World Games	International	Russia
3–4	Triathlon	(Mexico) Triathlon World Cup #6	International	Men: (South Africa) Richard Murray; Women: (Japan) Ai Ueda
3–10	Radio-controlled 1:10 off-road	(Japan) 2015 IFMAR 1:10 Electric Off-Road World Championship	International	2WD: (United States) Spencer Rivkin ( (United States) Team Associated); 4WD: (Portugal) Bruno Coelho ( (Slovakia) XRAY)
3–11	Tennis	2015 China Open	International	Men: (Serbia) Novak Djokovic; Women: (Spain) Garbiñe Muguruza
5–10	Volleyball	(Mexico) 2015 Men's NORCECA Volleyball Championship	Continental	Canada
5–15	Amateur boxing	(Qatar) 2015 AIBA World Boxing Championships	International	Cuba
8–11	Golf	(South Korea) 2015 Presidents Cup	International	United States
9–18	Volleyball	(Bulgaria) / (Italy) 2015 Men's European Volleyball Championship	Continental	France
10	Association football	(United States) 2015 CONCACAF Cup	Continental	Mexico
11	Formula One	(Russia) 2015 Russian Grand Prix	International	(United Kingdom) Lewis Hamilton ( (Germany) Mercedes)
11	Marathon	(United States) 2015 Chicago Marathon (WMM #5)	International	Men: (Kenya) Dickson Chumba; Women: (Kenya) Florence Kiplagat
11	Motorcycle racing	(Japan) 2015 Japanese motorcycle Grand Prix	International	MotoGP: (Spain) Dani Pedrosa ( (Japan) Repsol Honda Team); Moto2: (France) Johann Zarco ( (Finland) Ajo Motorsport); Moto3: (Italy) Niccolò Antonelli ( (Italy) Ongetta-Rivacold)
11–18	Tennis	(China) 2015 Shanghai Rolex Masters	International	(Serbia) Novak Djokovic
13–18	Amateur wrestling	(Greece) 2015 World Veterans Wrestling Championships	International	For results, click here.
14–17	Triathlon	(Australia) 2015 ITU Duathlon World Championships	International	Men: (Spain) Emilio Martín; Women: (United Kingdom) Emma Pallant
14–18	Track cycling	(Switzerland) 2015 UEC European Track Championships	Continental	Great Britain
16–18	Table tennis	(Sweden) 2015 Men's World Cup	International	(China) Ma Long
17–18	Air racing	(United States) Red Bull Air Race World Championship – Las Vegas	International	Master Class: (Australia) Matt Hall (Aircraft: MXS-R from (United States) MX Aircraft); Challenger Class: (France) Mikael Brageot (Aircraft: Extra 330LX from (Germany) Extra Flugzeugbau)
17–18	Triathlon	(Turkey) Triathlon World Cup #7	International	Men: (Portugal) João José Pereira; Women: (Ukraine) Yuliya Yelistratova
17–8 November	Association football	(Chile) 2015 FIFA U-17 World Cup	International	Nigeria
18	Motorcycle racing	(Australia) 2015 Australian motorcycle Grand Prix	International	MotoGP: (Spain) Marc Márquez ( (Japan) Repsol Honda Team); Moto2: (Spain) Álex Rins ( (Spain) Páginas Amarillas HP 40); Moto3: (Portugal) Miguel Oliveira ( (Finland) Red Bull KTM Ajo)
22–31	Athletics	(Qatar) 2015 IPC Athletics World Championships	International	China
23–27	Judo	(United Arab Emirates) 2015 World Junior Judo Championships	International	Japan
23–1 November	Artistic gymnastics	(United Kingdom) 2015 World Artistic Gymnastics Championships	International	Men: Japan; Women: United States; Overall: United States
24	Triathlon	(South Korea) Triathlon World Cup #8	International	Men: (United Kingdom) Matthew Sharp; Women: (Japan) Yuka Sato
25	Formula One	2015 United States Grand Prix	International	(United Kingdom) Lewis Hamilton ( (Germany) Mercedes)
25	Motorcycle racing	(Malaysia) 2015 Malaysian motorcycle Grand Prix	International	MotoGP: (Spain) Dani Pedrosa ( (Japan) Repsol Honda Team); Moto2: (France) Johann Zarco ( (Finland) Ajo Motorsport); Moto3: (Portugal) Miguel Oliveira ( (Finland) Red Bull KTM Ajo)
25–1 November	Tennis	(Singapore) 2015 WTA Finals	International	Singles: (Poland) Agnieszka Radwańska; Doubles: (Switzerland) Martina Hingis/ (India) Sania Mirza
27–31	Volleyball	(Brazil) 2015 FIVB Volleyball Men's Club World Championship	International	(Brazil) Sada Cruzeiro
27–1 November	Baseball	(United States) 2015 World Series	Domestic	(Missouri) Kansas City Royals; World Series MVP: (Venezuela) Salvador Pérez ( (Missouri) Kansas City Royals)
29–1 November	Table tennis	(Japan) 2015 Women's World Cup	International	(China) Liu Shiwen
30–8 November	Korfball	(Belgium) 2015 IKF World Korfball Championship	International	Netherlands
31–8 November	Tennis	(France) 2015 BNP Paribas Masters	International	(Serbia) Novak Djokovic

=== November ===
Date	Sport	Venue/Event	Status	Winner/s
1	Formula One	(Mexico) 2015 Mexican Grand Prix	International	(Germany) Nico Rosberg ( (Germany) Mercedes)
1	Marathon	(United States) 2015 New York City Marathon (WMM #6)	International	Men: (Kenya) Stanley Biwott; Women: (Kenya) Mary Jepkosgei Keitany
2–8	Tennis	(China) 2015 WTA Elite Trophy	International	Singles: (United States) Venus Williams; Doubles: (China) Liang Chen / (China) Wang Yafan
4–15	Association football	(China) 2015 AFC U-16 Women's Championship	Continental	North Korea
5–8	Golf	(China) 2015 WGC-HSBC Champions	International	(Scotland) Russell Knox
6–8	Roller derby	(United States) 2015 WFTDA International Championships	International	(United States) Division 1: Rose City Rollers Wheels of Justice (Portland, Oregon) (MVP: Scald Eagle) (United States) Division 2: Sacred City Sacrificers (Sacramento, California)
7–14	Curling	(Kazakhstan) 2015 Pacific-Asia Curling Championships	Continental	Men: South Korea (Skip: Kim Soo-hyuk); Women: Japan (Skip: Satsuki Fujisawa)
8	Motorcycle racing	(Spain) 2015 Valencian Community motorcycle Grand Prix	International	MotoGP: (Spain) Jorge Lorenzo ( (Japan) Movistar Yamaha MotoGP); Moto2: (Spain) Esteve Rabat ( (Belgium) EG 0,0 Marc VDS); Moto3: (Portugal) Miguel Oliveira ( (Finland) Red Bull KTM Ajo)
8–21	Baseball	(Chinese Taipei) / (Japan) 2015 WBSC Premier12	International	South Korea
14–22	Fistball	(Argentina) 2015 Men's Fistball World Championships	International	Germany
15	Formula One	(Brazil) 2015 Brazilian Grand Prix	International	(Germany) Nico Rosberg ( (Germany) Mercedes)
15–22	Squash	(United States) 2015 Men's World Open Squash Championship	International	(France) Grégory Gaultier
15–22	Tennis	(United Kingdom) 2015 ATP World Tour Finals	International	Singles: (Serbia) Novak Djokovic; Doubles: (Netherlands) Jean-Julien Rojer / (Romania) Horia Tecău
20–28	Curling	(Denmark) 2015 European Curling Championships	Continental	Men: Sweden (Skip: Niklas Edin); Women: Russia (Skip: Anna Sidorova)
20–28	Weightlifting	(United States) 2015 World Weightlifting Championships	International	China
20–29	Amateur boxing	(Poland) 2015 EUBC European Confederation Youth Boxing Championships	Continental	Russia
24–28	Powerlifting	(Hungary) 2015 IPC Powerlifting European Open Championships	Continental	China
25–29	Trampolining	(Denmark) 2015 Trampoline World Championships	International	China
28–6 December	Field hockey	(India) 2014–15 Men's FIH Hockey World League Final	International	Australia
28–12 December	Association football	(Senegal) 2015 U-23 Africa Cup of Nations	Continental	Nigeria
29	Canadian football	(Canada) 103rd Grey Cup	Domestic	(Alberta) Edmonton Eskimos
29	Formula One	(United Arab Emirates) 2015 Abu Dhabi Grand Prix	International	(Germany) Nico Rosberg ( (Germany) Mercedes)
29–6 December	Table tennis	(France) 2015 World Junior Table Tennis Championships	International	China

=== December ===
Date	Sport	Venue/Event	Status	Winner/s
2–20	Tennis	(Philippines) / (United Arab Emirates) / (India) / (Singapore) / (Japan) 2015 International Premier Tennis League	International	Singapore Slammers
3–9	Multi-sport	(Singapore) 2015 ASEAN Para Games	Regional	Thailand
5–13	Field hockey	(Argentina) 2014–15 Women's FIH Hockey World League Final	International	Argentina
5–20	Handball	(Denmark) 2015 World Women's Handball Championship	International	Norway
7–10	Ice hockey	(Bulgaria) 2016 IIHF Women's World Championship Division II – Group B Qualification	International	Romania is promoted to Division II – Group B
10–20	Association football	(Japan) 2015 FIFA Club World Cup	International	(Spain) Barcelona
12–18	Ice hockey	(France) 2016 World Junior Ice Hockey Championships Division I – Group B	International	France is promoted to Division I – Group A Japan is relegated to Division II – Group A
13–19	Ice hockey	(Austria) 2016 World Junior Ice Hockey Championships Division I – Group A	International	Latvia is promoted to the Top Division; Italy is relegated to Division I – Group B
13–19	Ice hockey	(Lithuania) 2016 World Junior Ice Hockey Championships Division II – Group A	International	Hungary is promoted to Division I – Group B South Korea is relegated to Division II – Group B
26–5 January 2016	Ice hockey	(Finland) 2016 World Junior Ice Hockey Championships	International	Finland

== Air sports ==
- February 13 – October 13: 2015 Red Bull Air Race World Championship
  - February 13 & 14: 2015 Red Bull Air Race of Abu Dhabi in (United Arab Emirates) Abu Dhabi
    - Open Master Class winner: (United Kingdom) Paul Bonhomme
    - Open Challenger Class winner: (Chile) Cristian Bolton
  - May 16 & 17: 2015 Red Bull Air Race of Chiba in (Japan) Chiba
    - Open Master Class winner: (United Kingdom) Paul Bonhomme
    - Open Challenger Class winner: (Czech Republic) Petr Kopfstein
  - May 30 & 31: 2015 Red Bull Air Race of Rovinj in (Croatia) Rovinj
    - Open Master Class winner: (Austria) Hannes Arch
    - Open Challenger Class winner: (Sweden) Daniel Ryfa
  - July 4 & 5: 2015 Red Bull Air Race of Budapest in (Hungary) Budapest
    - Open Master Class winner: (Austria) Hannes Arch
    - Open Challenger Class winner: (Sweden) Daniel Ryfa
  - August 15 & 16: 2015 Red Bull Air Race of Ascot in (United Kingdom) Ascot
    - Open Master Class winner: (United Kingdom) Paul Bonhomme
    - Open Challenger Class winner: (Czech Republic) Petr Kopfstein
  - September 5 & 6: 2015 Red Bull Air Race of Spielberg in (Austria) Spielberg
    - Open Master Class winner: (Australia) Matt Hall
    - Open Challenger Class winner: (France) Mikaël Brageot
  - September 26 & 27: 2015 Red Bull Air Race of Fort Worth in (United States) Fort Worth
    - Open Master Class winner: (United Kingdom) Paul Bonhomme
    - Open Challenger Class winner: (France) Mikaël Brageot
  - October 17 & 18: 2015 Red Bull Air Race of Las Vegas in (United States) Las Vegas
    - Open Master Class winner: (Australia) Matt Hall
    - Open Challenger Class winner: (France) Mikaël Brageot

=== World Championships ===
- January 13–24: AirSports FAI Paragliding World Championships 2015 in (Colombia) Roldanillo
  - Open Individual Cross Country winner: (France) Honorin Hamard
  - Women's Individual Cross-Country winner: (France) Seiko Fukuoka Naville
  - Open Team Cross Country winners: Germany (Torsten Siegel, Marc Wensauer, Ulrich Prinz, Andreas "Pepe" Malecki, Yvonne Dathe)
- February 28 – March 13: AirSports FAI Hang Gliding Class 1 World Championships 2015 in (Mexico) Valle de Bravo
  - Open Individual Hang Gliding winner: (Italy) Christian Ciech
  - Open Team Hang Gliding winners: Italy (Christian Ciech, Filippo Oppici, Davide Guiducci, Suan Selenati, Tullio Gervasoni, Valentino Baù)
- June 27 – July 2: Air Sports FAI Paramotor Slalom World Championships 2015 in (Poland) Legnica
  - Open Paraglider Control Foot Launched Flown Solo winner: (France) Jérémy Penone
  - Open Team winners: Thailand
  - Open Paraglider Control Landplane Flown Solo winner: (Poland) Wojtek Bógdał
  - Mixed Paraglider Control Landplane Flown winners: Russia
- July 20–24: Air Sports FAI Precision Flying World Championships 2015 in (Denmark) Skive
  - Open Individual winner: (France) Damien Vadon
  - Open Individual Landing Trophy winner: (Finland) Mauri Hälinen
  - Open Individual Navigation Trophy winner: (Poland) Marcin Skalik
  - Open Team Trophy winners: Poland (Marcin Skalik, Bolesław Radomski, Michał Wieczorek)
  - Open Team Landing Trophy winners: Czech Republic (Tomáš Rajdl, David Černý, Jiří Jakeš)
- August 2–13: Women's Air Sports FAI Gliding World Championships 2015 in (Denmark) Arnborg
  - Women's 15 meters Class winner: (France) Anne Ducarouge
  - Women's Club Class winner: (Germany) Sabrina Vogt
  - Women's Standard Class winner: (France) Aude Grangeray
- August 2–15: Air Sports FAI 13.5m Class Gliding World Championships 2015 in (Lithuania) Pociūnai Airport
  - Open 13.5m Class winner: (Italy) Stefano Ghiorzo
- August 5–15: Air Sports FAI Glider Aerobatic World Championships 2015 in Zbraslavice Airport
  - Open Unlimited winner: (Hungary) Ferenc Tóth
  - Open Team Unlimited winners: Czech Republic (Přemysl Vávra, Miroslav Červenka, Lucie Pešková)
  - Open Advanced winner: (Czech Republic) Miroslav Černý
  - Open Team Advanced winners: Poland (Sławomir Talowski, Katarzyna Żmudziński, Michał Andrzejewski)
- August 9–16: Air Sports FAI Aerobatic Model Aircraft World Championships 2015 in (Switzerland) Dübendorf
  - Open F3A winner: (France) Christophe Paysant-Leroux
  - Open Junior F3A winner: (United States) Joseph Szczur
  - Open Team F3A winners: United States
- August 9–17: Air Sports FAI Paragliding Accuracy World Championships 2015 in (Indonesia) Puncak
  - Men's Individual winner: (Indonesia) Dede Supratman
- August 13–16: Air Sports FAI Helicopter World Championships 2015 in (Poland) Przylep
  - Open Helicopter winners: Russia (Maxim Sotnikov, Oleg Puajukas)
  - Women's Helicopter winners: Russia (Liudmila Kosenkova, Elena Prokofyeva)
  - Open Team winners: Russia
- August 20–29: Air Sports FAI Aerobatic World Championships 201 in (France) Châteauroux
  - Men's Unlimited winner: (France) Alexandre Orlowski
  - Women's Unlimited winner: (France) Aude Lemordant
- August 26–28: Air Sports FAI F1E For Free Flight Model Aircraft World Championships 2015 in (Serbia) Zlatibor
  - Open Junior Individual F1E winner: (Slovakia) Viktoria Drmlova
  - Open Junior Team F1E winners: Italy
  - Open Individual F1E winner (Czech Republic) Jaromir Orel
  - Open Team F1E winners: Italy
- September 5–12: Air Sports FAI Sailplane Grand Prix World Championships 2015 in (Italy) Varese
  - Open Individual winner: (France) Maximilian Seis
- October 21–24: Air Sports FAI Indoor Skydiving World Championships 2015 in (Czech Republic) Prague
  - Open Freestyle winners: Finland
  - Open Junior Freestyle winners: Poland
  - Open Formation Skydiving 4-Way winners: Belgium
  - Women's Formation Skydiving 4-Way winners: United States
  - Open Vertical Formation Skydiving winners: France
- December 1–12: Air Sports FAI Junior Gliding World Championships 2015 in (Australia) Narromine
  - Open Club Class winner: (United Kingdom) Tom Arscott
  - Open Standard Class winner: (Australia) Matthew Scutter
- December 1–12: FIA World Air Games 2015 in (United Arab Emirates) Dubai
  - Gold and total medal winner: United States

== American football ==
- Super Bowl XLIX – the New England Patriots (AFC) won 28–24 over the Seattle Seahawks (NFC)
  - Location: University of Phoenix Stadium
  - Attendance: 70,288
  - MVP: Tom Brady, QB (New England)

== Archery ==
=== Indoor ===
- November 8, 2014 – February 8, 2015: 2014–15 WA Indoor Archery Calendar
  - November 8 & 9, 2014: Indoor Archery World Cup #1 in (Morocco) Marrakesh
    - France and Italy won 2 gold medals each. France won the overall medal tally.
  - December 6 & 7, 2014: Indoor Archery World Cup #2 in (Thailand) Bangkok
    - South Korea and the United States won 2 gold medals each. The United States won the overall medal tally.
  - January 23–25, 2015: Indoor Archery World Cup #3 in (France) Nîmes
    - Hungary and South Korea won 2 gold medals each. South Korea won the overall medal tally.
  - February 6 – 8, 2015: Indoor Archery World Cup #4 (final) in (United States) Las Vegas
    - South Korea won both the gold and overall medal tallies.

==== Other indoor archery championships ====
- December 8 & 9, 2014: Indoor Para Archery World Cup in Bangkok
  - Thailand and the United States won 1 gold medal each. Russia won the overall medal tally.
- February 24 – 28: European Indoor Archery Championships in (Slovenia) Koper
  - Germany, Italy, Netherlands, Russia, and Ukraine won 2 gold medals each. Italy won the overall medal tally.

=== Outdoor ===
- May 5 – October 25: 2015 WA Outdoor Archery Calendar
  - May 5 – 10: Outdoor Archery World Cup #1 in (China) Shanghai
    - South Korea won both the gold and overall medal tallies.
  - May 26 – 31: Outdoor Archery World Cup #2 in (Turkey) Antalya
    - South Korea won both the gold and overall medal tallies.
  - August 11–16: Outdoor Archery World Cup #3 in (Poland) Wrocław
    - The United States won both the gold and overall medal tallies.
  - September 8–13: Outdoor Archery World Cup #4 in (Colombia) Medellín
    - South Korea won the gold medal tally. The United States won the overall medal tally.
  - October 24 & 25: Outdoor Archery World Cup Final in Mexico City
    - South Korea won the gold medal tally. South Korea and Mexico won 3 overall medals each.

==== Other outdoor archery championships ====
- June 8–14: 2015 World Archery Youth Championships in Yankton, South Dakota
  - South Korea won the gold medal tally. The United States won the overall medal tally.
- July 26 – August 2: 2015 World Archery Championships in (Denmark) Copenhagen
  - South Korea won both the gold and overall medal tallies.
- August 23–30: 2015 World Archery Para Championships in (Germany) Donaueschingen
  - China won the gold medal tally. China and Great Britain won 10 overall medals each.
- September 1–5: 2015 World Archery 3D Championships in Terni
  - Italy and Spain won 3 gold medals each. Italy won the overall medal tally.
- September 15–22: Aquece Rio International Archery Challenge 2015 in Brazil (Olympic and Paralympic Test Event)
  - South Korea won both the gold and overall medal tallies.
- October 3 & 4: European Club Team Cup in (France) Riom
  - Men's Team winners: (France) Archers Riomois (Paul Bonneau, Thomas Antoine, Lucas Daniel)
  - Women's Team winners: (France) La Sentinelle Brienon (Josée Auboeuf, Bérengère Schuh, Laura Ruggieri)
- October 6–10: 2015 European Field Archery Championships in (Poland) Rzeszów
  - Italy won both the gold and overall medal tallies.
- November 1–8: 2015 Asian Archery Championships in (Thailand) Bangkok
  - South Korea won both the gold and overall medal tallies.
- November 10–19: 2015 Asian Para Archery Championships in (Thailand) Bangkok
  - China won both the gold and overall medal tallies.

== Beach soccer ==
- January 23 – December 20: 2015 Beach Soccer Worldwide Calendar of Events
  - January 23–25: Copa Beach Soccer Viña del Mar 2015 in Chile
    - Winner: Mexico
  - February 1 – 8: 2015 Copa Sudamericana de Beach Soccer in Recife
    - Brazil defeated Paraguay 12–2. Argentina took third place.
  - March 6–8: 2015 Power Horse Beach Soccer African Trophy in (South Africa) Durban
    - Senegal defeated Ivory Coast 5–4. Nigeria took third place.
  - March 23–28: 2015 AFC Beach Soccer Championship in (Qatar) Doha
    - Oman defeated Japan, 3–2 in penalties and after a 1–1 score in regular play, to win their first AFC Beach Soccer Championship title. Iran took third place.
  - March 28 – April 4: 2015 CONCACAF Beach Soccer Championship in San Salvador
    - Mexico defeated Costa Rica, 4–0, to win their third CONCACAF Beach Soccer Championship title. Host nation, El Salvador, took third place.
  - April 14 – 19: 2015 CAF Beach Soccer Championship in (Seychelles) Roche Caiman
    - Madagascar defeated Senegal, 2–1 in penalty shots and after a 1–1 tie in regular play, to win their first CAF Beach Soccer Championships title. Nigeria took third place.
  - April 19 – 26: 2015 CONMEBOL Beach Soccer Championship in Manta, Ecuador
    - Brazil defeated Paraguay, 8–3, to win their fifth CONMEBOL Beach Soccer Championship title. Argentina took third place.
  - May 1 – 3: Barcelona Beach Soccer Cup 2015 in Spain (debut event)
    - (Russia) FC Lokomotiv Moscow defeated (Brazil) CR Flamengo, 6–4, to win the inaugural Barcelona Beach Soccer Cup title. (Spain) FC Barcelona took third place.
  - June 2–7: Euro Winners Cup 2015 in (Italy) Catania
    - (Russia) BSC Kristall (KRS) defeated (Italy) DomusBet BS Catania (CTN), 6–2, to win their second consecutive Euro Winners Cup title. (Ukraine) FC Vybor (FCV) took third place.
  - July 18 & 19: Euro Nationscup Linz 2015 in Austria
    - The Czech Republic defeated Austria, 3–2 in penalty shots and after a 3–3 score in regular play, in the final. Slovakia took third place.
  - July 24–26: Friendship Cup 2015 in Belarus
    - Iran defeated Belarus, 3–2, in the final. Estonia took third place.
  - August 14–16: BSWW Tour El Jadida 2015 in Morocco
    - Winner: Morocco
  - September 2–6: Mediterranean Beach Games Pescara 2015 in Italy
    - Italy defeated Egypt, 5–1, in the final. Libya took third place.
  - September 18–20: Istanbul Beach Soccer Cup 2015 in Turkey
    - Winner: (United Arab Emirates) Al-Ahli Club
  - November 3–7: Samsung Beach Soccer Intercontinental Cup Dubai 2015 in the United Arab Emirates
    - Russia defeated Tahiti, 5–2, in the final. Iran took third place.
  - December 9–13: IV Mundialito de Clubes Beach Soccer in (Brazil) Barra da Tijuca, Rio de Janeiro
    - (Spain) FC Barcelona defeated (Brazil) CR Vasco da Gama, 3–2 in penalties and after a 4–4 score in regular play, in the final. (United Arab Emirates) Al-Ahli took third place.
  - December 18–20: BSWW Tour Copa Lagos 2015 in Nigeria
    - Winner: Ivory Coast

=== Euro Beach Soccer League ===
- June 12 – August 23: 2015 Euro Beach Soccer League
  - June 12–14: #1 in Moscow
    - Group 1 winners: Russia
    - Group 2 winners: Italy
    - Note: With the group winners, France, Belarus, and Portugal all qualified to compete in the Super Final.
  - August 7–9: #2 in Siófok
    - Division A winners: Switzerland
    - Division B Group 1 winners: Azerbaijan
    - Division B Group 2 winners: Turkey
    - Note 1: With the division winners, Spain and Ukraine qualify for the Super Final.
    - Note 2: Hungary, England, Czech Republic, Romania, and Norway all qualified for the Promotional Final.
  - August 20–23: Euro Beach Soccer League Superfinal & Promotion Final Pärnu 2015 in Estonia
    - Superfinal: Portugal defeated Ukraine, 5–4, in the final match. Russia took third place.
    - Promotional Final: Romania defeated Estonia, 3–2 in penalties and after a 6–6 tie in regular play, in the final match. The Czech Republic took third place.

=== FIFA Beach Soccer World Cup ===
- July 9–19: 2015 FIFA Beach Soccer World Cup in Espinho at the Praia da Baía
  - Portugal defeated Tahiti, 5–3, to win their second FIFA Beach Soccer World Cup title. Russia took third place.

== Boccia ==
- March 30 – April 5: 2015 Boccia European Continental Cup in (Spain) Sant Cugat del Vallès (debut event)
  - Individual BC1 winner: (Greece) Panagiotis Soulanis
  - Individual BC2 winner: (United Kingdom) Nigel Murray
  - Individual BC3 winner: (United Kingdom) Jacob Thomas
  - Individual BC4 winner: (United Kingdom) Keiran Steer
  - Pairs BC3 winners: Greece
  - Pairs BC4 winners: Slovakia
  - BC1/BC2 Team winners: Great Britain
- April 29 – May 4: 2015 Boccia Americas Team and Pairs Championships in Montreal
  - Pairs BC3 winners: Brazil
  - Pairs BC4 winners: Canada
  - BC1/BC2 Team winners: Argentina
- June 10–14: 2015 Boccia Asia/Oceania Team & Pairs Championships in Hong Kong
  - Pairs BC3 winners: South Korea
  - Pairs BC4 winners: China
  - BC1/BC2 Team winners: Thailand
- June 17–22: 2015 Boccia World Open #1 in (Poland) Poznań
  - Individual BC1 winner: (Netherlands) Daniel Pérez
  - Individual BC2 winner: (Brazil) Maciel Santos
  - Individual BC3 winner: (Greece) Grigorios Polychronidis
  - Individual BC4 winner: (Portugal) Domingos Vieira
  - Pairs BC3 winners: Portugal
  - Pairs BC4 winners: Portugal
  - BC1/BC2 Team winners: Japan
- July 17–23: 2015 Boccia World Open #2 in Seoul
  - Individual BC1 winner: (Thailand) Pattaya Tadtong
  - Individual BC2 winner: (Thailand) Worawut Saengampa
  - Individual BC3 winner: (South Korea) Jeong Ho-won
  - Individual BC4 winner: (Hong Kong) Leung Yuk-wing
  - Pairs BC3 winners: South Korea
  - Pairs BC4 winners: China
  - BC1/BC2 Team winners: Thailand
- July 25 & 26: 2015 Boccia European Team and Pairs Championships in (United Kingdom) Guildford
  - Pairs BC3 winners: Belgium
  - Pairs BC4 winners: Slovakia
  - BC1/BC2 Team winners: Great Britain
- August 7–15: 2015 Boccia Americas Continental Cup in Toronto (with the 2015 Parapan American Games)
  - Individual BC1 winner: (Brazil) Jose Carlos Chagas
  - Individual BC2 winner: (Brazil) Maciel de Souza Santos
  - Individual BC3 winner: (Brazil) Richardson Santos
  - Individual BC4 winner: (Brazil) Eliseu dos Santos
  - Pairs BC3 winners: Canada
  - Pairs BC4 winners: Brazil
  - BC1/BC2 Team winners: Brazil
- October 28 – November 3: 2015 Boccia World Open #3 in (Colombia) Cali
  - Individual BC1 winner: (Netherlands) Daniel Pérez
  - Individual BC2 winner: (China) Yan Zhiqiang
  - Individual BC3 winner: (Portugal) José Macedo
  - Individual BC4 winner: (Thailand) Pornchok Larpyen
  - Pairs BC3 winners: France
  - Pairs BC4 winners: Hong Kong
  - BC1/BC2 Team winners: Slovakia
- November 12–14: Aquece Rio International Boccia Tournament 2015 in Brazil (Paralympic Test Event)
  - Individual BC1 winner: (United Kingdom) David Smith
  - Individual BC2 winner: (Brazil) Maciel dos Santos
  - Individual BC3 winner: (Brazil) Hygor Santos
  - Pairs BC3 winners: Brazil
  - BC1/BC2 Team winners: Brazil

== Canadian football ==
- November 28 – 51st Vanier Cup in Quebec City
  - The (British Columbia) UBC Thunderbirds defeated the (Quebec) Montreal Carabins, 26–23, to win their fourth Vanier Cup title.
- November 29 – 103rd Grey Cup in (Manitoba) Winnipeg
  - The Edmonton Eskimos defeated the Ottawa Redblacks, 26–20, to win their 14th Grey Cup title.

== Chess ==
- February 14 – December 20: 2015 FIDE (World Chess Federation) Calendar

=== Majors ===
- October 1, 2014 – May 27, 2015: FIDE Grand Prix 2014–15
  - October 1–15, 2014: #1 FIDE Grand Prix in (Azerbaijan) Baku
    - Winners: (Italy) Fabiano Caruana 6.5/11 (+4=5–2) and (Israel) Boris Gelfand 6.5/11 (+3=7–1).
  - October 20 – November 3, 2014: #2 FIDE Grand Prix in (Uzbekistan) Tashkent
    - Winner: (Russia) Dmitry Andreikin 7/11 (+3=8–0)
  - February 14–28, 2015: #3 FIDE Grand Prix in (Georgia (country)) Tbilisi
    - Winner: (Russia) Evgeny Tomashevsky 8/11 (+5=6–0)
  - May 13–27: #4 FIDE Grand Prix (final) in (Russia) Khanty-Mansiysk
    - Winners: Hikaru Nakamura (USA), Fabiano Caruana (ITA) and Dmitry Jakovenko (RUS) 6.5/11
- February 24 – March 4: World Senior Team Chess Championship 2015 in Dresden
  - (50+) W: Slovakia
  - (65+) W: Russia
  - (Women's) W: Germany Women 1
- March 16 – April 7: Women's World Chess Championship 2015 in (Russia) Sochi
  - In the final (Ukraine) Mariya Muzychuk defeated (Russia) Natalia Pogonina 2½ – 1½.
- April 13–22: World Amateur Chess Championship 2015 in (Greece) Chalkidiki
  - Men's winner: (Turkey) Mire Deniz Dogan
  - Women's winner: (Moldova) Paula-Alexandra Gitu
- April 18–28: Men's World Team Chess Championship in (Armenia) Tsaghkadzor
  - Winners: China (Ding Liren, Yu Yangyi, Bu Xiangzhi, Wei Yi, Wang Chen)
- April 18–29: Women's World Team Championship 2015 in (China) Chengdu
  - Winners: Georgia (Bela Khotenashvili, Lela Javakhishvili, Meri Arabidze, Nino Batsiashvili, Salome Melia)
- May 6–15: World Schools Individual Championships 2015 in (Thailand) Pattaya
  - China won both the gold and overall medal tallies.
- September 1–16: World Junior U20 Championships 2015 in (Russia) Khanty-Mansiysk
  - Men's winner: (Russia) Mikhail Antipov
  - Women's winner: (Ukraine) Nataliya Buksa
- September 10 – October 4: Chess World Cup 2015 in (Azerbaijan) Baku
  - Winner: (Russia) Sergey Karjakin
- October 2–16: Women's FIDE Grand Prix 2015–16 #1 stage in (Monaco) Monte Carlo
  - Winner: (China) Hou Yifan
- October 9–15: World Rapid and Blitz Championships 2015 in (Germany) Berlin
  - Rapid Winner: (Norway) Magnus Carlsen
  - Blitz Winner: (Russia) Alexander Grischuk
- October 24 – November 5: World Youth and Cadets Championships 2015 in (Greece)
  - India won both the gold and overall medal tallies.
- November 9–22: World Senior Chess Championship 2015 in (Italy) Acqui Terme
  - Men's 65+ winner: (France) Vladimir Okhotnik
  - Women's 65+ winner: (Georgia (country)) Nona Gaprindashvili
  - Men's 50+ winner: (Bosnia and Herzegovina) Predrag Nikolić
  - Women's 50+ winner: (Russia) Galina Strutinskaia

=== European Events ===
- February 23 – March 9: 2015 European Individual Chess Championship in (Israel) Jerusalem
  - Winner: (Russia) Evgeniy Najer
- April 18–26: European Small Nations Team Chess Championship 2015 in (Guernsey) St. Peter Port
  - Winners: Luxembourg
- April 28 – May 8: European Senior Chess Championship 2015 in (Greece) Eretria
  - Seniors +50: (Georgia (country)) Zurab Sturua
  - Seniors +65: (Belgium) Jan Rooze
  - Women's Seniors +50: (Russia) Svetlana Mednikova
  - Women's Seniors +65: (Georgia (country)) Nona Gaprindashvili
- May 18–31: European Women's Championship 2015 in (Georgia (country)) Chakvi
  - Winner: (Ukraine) Natalia Zhukova
- June 24 – July 3: European Schools Championship 2015 in Konya
  - Turkey won both the gold and overall medal tallies.
- July 12–20: European Senior Team Championship 2015 in (Austria) Vienna
  - Winner: Saint Petersburg
- July 13–19: European Youth Team Chess Championship 2015 in (Poland) Karpacz
  - Winner: Germany
- July 31 – August 6: European Youth Rapid and Blitz Championships 2015 in (Serbia) Novi Sad
  - Belarus won both the gold and overall medal tallies.
- August 8–16: European Amateur Championship 2015 in (Lithuania) Kaunas
  - Men's winner: (Lithuania) Lukas Jonkus
  - Women's winner: (Lithuania) Marina Malisauskiene
  - Blitz tournament winner: (Lithuania) Laurynas Miknevicius
- September 20 – October 1: European Youth U8 – U18 Championship 2015 in (Croatia) Poreč
  - Russia won both the gold and overall medal tallies.
- October 6–10: European Universities Chess Championship 2015 in (Armenia) Yerevan
  - Men's winner: (Russia) Sanan Sjugirov
  - Women's winner: (Russia) Daria Pustovoitova
- October 17–25: European Club Cup 2015 in (North Macedonia) Skopje
  - Winner: (Russia) Siberia
- October 17–25: European Club Cup for Women 2015 in (North Macedonia) Skopje
  - Winner: (Georgia (country)) Nona
- November 12–22: European Team Chess Championship 2015 in (Iceland) Reykjavík
  - Men's winners: Russia
  - Women's winners: Russia
- December 17–20: European Rapid and Blitz Championships 2015 in (Belarus) Minsk
  - Rapid winner: (Russia) Ivan Popov
  - Blitz winner: (Azerbaijan) Rauf Mamedov

=== American Zonals ===
- March 31 – April 13: American Zonal 2.1 Open & Women in (Missouri) St. Louis
  - Winners: (United States) Hikaru Nakamura (m) / (United States) Irina Krush (f)
- March 31 – April 6: American Zonal 2.3 Open in (Ecuador) Santa Elena
  - Winner: (Cuba) Lázaro Bruzón
- April 20–27: American Zonal 2.4 in (Peru) Lima
  - Winner: (Peru) Jorge Cori
- April 27 – May 3: American Zonal 2.5 in (Paraguay) Asunción
  - Winner: (Argentina) Sandro Mareco
- July 9–16: American Zonal 2.2 in (Canada) Guelph
  - Winner: (Canada) Tomas Krnan
- November 5–13: American Zonal 2.5 Women in (Argentina) Villa Martelli
  - Winner: (Argentina) Carolina Lujan

=== American Events ===
- April 2–7: CARIFTA Games in (Barbados) Christ Church
- April 22–28: South American Junior U20 Championship 2015 in (Colombia) Santander
  - Boys' winner: (Argentina) Julio Benedetti
  - Girls' winner: (Venezuela) Jorcerys Montilla Reyes
- May 15–24: American Continental Chess Championship 2015 in (Uruguay) Montevideo
  - Men's winner: (Argentina) Sandro Mareco
- June 27 – July 4: Panamerican Youth Festival & Blitz in Bogotá
  - (gold) : Peru (131 points)
  - (silver) : United States (112 p.)
  - (bronze) : Colombia (101 p.)
- July 25–30: North American Junior U20 Championship 2015 in (Canada) Kitchener
  - Men's winner: (United States) Kesav Viswanadha
  - Women's winner: (United States) Agata Bykovtsev
- July 28–30: Central American & Caribbean Team Chess Championship 2015 in Managua
  - Winner: Guatemala
  - Women's winner: Nicaragua
  - Blitz winner: Guatemala
  - Women's Blitz winner: Guatemala
- August 6–12: Panamerican Schools Chess Championship 2015 in (Costa Rica) (TBD)
- August 14–19: Central American & Caribbean Youth Chess Championships 2015 in Port of Spain
  - Trinidad and Tobago won both the gold and overall medal tallies.
- August 19–26: Panamerican Amateur Chess Championships 2015 in (Bolivia) Chuquisaca
- August 21–29: Central American & Caribbean Junior U20 Chess Championships 2015 in (Venezuela) Porlamar
  - Men's winner: (Cuba) Augusto César Campos Jiménez
  - Women's winner: (Venezuela) Rovira Contreras Tairu Manuel
- August 21–29: Panamerican Senior Chess Championship 2015 in (Venezuela) Porlamar
  - Men's +50 winner: (Canada) David H. Cummings
  - Men's +65 winner: (Venezuela) Anibal Gamboa Gonzalez
- August 31 – September 7: Panamerican Junior U20 Championship 2015 in (El Salvador) San Salvador
  - Boys' winner: (Peru) Kevin Cori Quispe
  - Girls' winner: (United States) Ashritha Eswaran
- December 2–7: South American Youth Festival 2015 in (Bolivia) Santa Cruz de la Sierra
  - Brazil won both the gold. Peru overall medal tallies.

=== Asian Zonals ===
- March 6–16: Asian Zonal 3.3 in (Vietnam) Ho Chi Minh City
  - Winners: (Vietnam) Lê Quang Liêm (m) / (Vietnam) Phạm Lê Thảo Nguyên (f)
- March 26 – April 2: Asian Zonal 3.2 in (Nepal) Kathmandu
  - Winners: (Bangladesh) Ziaur Rahman (m) / (Bangladesh) Akter Liza Shamima (f)
- May 16–25: Asian Zonal 3.1 in (Oman) Muscat
  - Winners: (Iran) Pouya Idani (m) / (Qatar) Zhu Chen (f)
- June 3–12: Asian Zonal 3.4 in (Tajikistan) Dushanbe
  - Winners: (Kazakhstan) Rinat Jumabayev (m) / (Kazakhstan) Dinara Saduakassova (f)
- June 30 – July 6: Asian Zonal 3.5 Women in (China) Zhongshan
  - Winner: (China) Tan Zhongyi
- July 4–10: Asian Zonal 3.6 in (Australia) Sydney
  - Winners: (Australia) Max Illingworth (m) / (Australia) Emma Guo (f)

=== Asian Events ===
- May 30 – June 8: 11th Asian Schools Chess Championships 2015 in Singapore
  - Winners: The Philippines won both the gold. India won overall medal tallies.
- June 8–17: ASEAN+ Age Group Championships 2015 in Singapore
  - Winners: Vietnam won both the gold and overall medal tallies.
- July 21–28: Asian Cities Team Championships 2015 in (Sri Lanka) Colombo
  - Winner: (India) Bangalore
- August 1–13: Asian Continental Championships 2015 in (United Arab Emirates) Al Ain
  - Men's winner: (United Arab Emirates) Salem A.R. Saleh
  - Women's winner: (Iran) Mitra Hejazipour
  - Men's Rapid winner: (Vietnam) Nguyễn Ngọc Trường Sơn
  - Women's Rapid Winner: (China) Tan Zhongyi
  - Men's Blitz winner: (United Arab Emirates) Salem A.R. Saleh
  - Women's Blitz winner: (Qatar) Zhu Chen
- September 6–13: Asian Amateur Championship 2015 in (Brunei) Bandar Seri Begawan
  - Winner: (India) T. Shyam Sundar
  - Blitz winner: (Uzbekistan) Shahzod Akhidov
- September 24 – October 2: Asian Seniors Championship 2015 in (Iran) Larestan
  - Men's +50 winner: (Pakistan) Mahmood Lodhi
  - Men's +65 winner: (India) Wazeer Ahmad Khan
  - Women's +50 winner: (New Zealand) Helen Milligan
  - Women's +65 winner: (Kazakhstan) Bakhyt Badamshina
- October 3–10: Asian Juniors and Girls U20 Championship 2015 in (Kyrgyzstan) Bishkek
  - Boys' winner: (Iran) Masoud Mosadeghpour
  - Girls' winner: (Uzbekistan) Gulrukhbegim Tokhirjonova
- November 23 – December 5: Asian Youth U8, 10, 12, 14, 16, 18 Championship 2015 in (South Korea) Seoul
  - India won both the gold and overall medal tallies.

=== African Zonals ===
- March 13–22: African Zonal 4.4 in (Togo) Lomé
  - Winner: (Nigeria) Bomo Kigigha (m) / (Nigeria) Omolabake Coker (f)
- March 25 – April 1: African Zonal 4.1 in (Tunisia) Hammamet
  - Winners: (Algeria) Mohamed Amine Haddouche (m) / (Algeria) Amina Mezioud (f)
- April 17–26: African Zonal 4.3 in (Malawi) Blantyre
  - Winners: (Zambia) Daniel Jere (m) / (Zambia) Lorita Mwango (f)
- April 17–26: African Zonal 4.2 in (Uganda) Kampala
  - Winners: (Egypt) Essam El-Gindy (m) / (Egypt) Eman Elansary (f)

=== African Events ===
- May 1–13: African Individual Championships 2015 in (Egypt) Cairo
  - Men's winner: (Egypt) Bassem Amin
  - Women's winner: (Egypt) Mona Khaled
- July 31 – August 10: African Amateur Championships 2015 in (Mozambique) Maputo
  - Open Category winner: (Botswana) Thuso Mosutha
  - Women Section winner: (Zambia) Phylis Namasiku Mwilola
- August 14–23: African Schools Individual Championships 2015 in (Tanzania) Dar es Salaam
  - South Africa won both the gold and overall medal tallies.
- December 4–14: African Youth Championships 2015 in (Zambia) Livingstone
  - Algeria won both the gold and overall medal tallies.
- December 27, 2015 – 6 January 2016: African Junior Championships 2015 in (Seychelles) Mahé
  - Boys' winner: (Angola) David Silva
  - Girls' winner: (Egypt) Shahenda Wafa

== Cricket ==
- February 14 – March 29: 2015 Cricket World Cup in Australia and New Zealand (the final will take place at the Melbourne Cricket Ground)
  - Australia defeated New Zealand, by seven wickets, to win their fifth Cricket World Cup title.
- July 8 – August 24: 2015 Ashes series between England and Australia
  - July 8–12: First test at the SWALEC Stadium in (Wales) Cardiff
    - England won over Australia by 169 runs.
  - July 16–20: Second test at the Lord's Cricket Ground in London
    - Australia won over England by 405 runs.
  - July 29 – August 2: Third test at the Edgbaston Cricket Ground in Birmingham
    - England won over Australia by 8 wickets.
  - August 6–10: Fourth test at Trent Bridge in Nottingham
    - England won over Australia by 1 innings and 78 runs.
  - August 20–24: Fifth and final test at The Oval in London
    - Australia won over England by 1 innings and 46 runs.

== Field hockey ==
=== FIH Hockey World League ===
- June 21, 2014 – December 13, 2015: 2014–15 Women's FIH Hockey World League (final will be held in Rosario)
  - Argentina defeated New Zealand, 5–1, to win their first Women's FIH Hockey World League title. Germany took third place.
- July 1, 2014 – December 6, 2015: 2014–15 Men's FIH Hockey World League (final will be held in Raipur)
  - Australia defeated Belgium, 2–1, to win their first Men's FIH Hockey World League title. India took third place.

=== Indoor Hockey World Cup ===
- February 4 – 8: 2015 Indoor Hockey World Cup for Men and Women in Leipzig
  - Men: The Netherlands defeated Austria, 3–2, to win their first Men's Indoor Hockey World Cup title. Germany took third place.
  - Women: The Netherlands defeated Germany, 1–0 in a penalty shoot-out and after a 1–1 score in regular play, to win their second Women's Indoor Hockey World Cup title. The Czech Republic took third place.

=== 2016 Summer Olympics ===
- November 24–28: Aquece Rio International Hockey Championship 2015 in Brazil (Olympic Test Event)
  - Men's team winners: Brazil
  - Women's team winners: Barbados

=== European Hockey Federation (EHF) ===
- January 16 – August 30: EHF's Eurohockey 2015 Season
- January 16–18: EHF Junior Indoor European Championship 2015 in Toruń
  - Austria defeated Poland, 2–1, in a shoot-out and after a 2–2 score in regular play. Russia took third place.
- January 16–18: EHF Junior Indoor European Championship II 2015 in Sveti Ivan Zelina
  - Winner: Czech Republic (16 points, with a GD of 57)
  - Second: Croatia (16 points, with a GD of 33)
  - Third: Slovakia (12 points)
- January 23–25: Women's EHF Junior Indoor European Championship 2015 in (Czech Republic) Prague
  - Russia defeated Poland, with the score of 5–3 in the final. Austria took third place.
- February 13 – 15: 2015 MWB EuroHockey Indoor Club Cup in (Germany) Mülheim
  - (Germany) HTC Uhlenhorst Mülheim defeated (Austria) SV Arminen, 5–4, in the final. (Spain) C.H. SPV Complutense took third place.
- February 13 – 15: 2015 EuroHockey Indoor Club Trophy in (Denmark) Kongens Lyngby
  - (Poland) WKS Grunwald Poznań and (Czech Republic) HC Bohemians Prague are promoted to the EuroHockey Indoor Club Champions Cup 2016.
  - (Denmark) Orient Lyngby and (Croatia) HAHK Mladost are relegated to the EuroHockey Indoor Club Champions Challenge I 2016.
- February 13 – 15: 2015 EuroHockey Indoor Club Challenge I in (Netherlands) Rotterdam
  - (Netherlands) HC Rotterdam and (Portugal) A.D. Lousada are promoted to the EuroHockey Indoor Club Champions Trophy 2016.
  - (Slovenia) HC Lipovci and (Hungary) Soroksari HC are relegated to the EuroHockey Indoor Club Champions Challenge II 2016.
- February 13 – 15: 2015 EuroHockey Indoor Club Challenge II in (Bulgaria) Varna
  - (Bulgaria) HC NSA Sofia and (Finland) HC Kilppari are promoted to the EuroHockey Indoor Club Challenge I 2016.
- February 20 – 22: 2015 Women's EuroHockey Indoor Club Cup in (Lithuania) Šiauliai
  - (Germany) UHC Hamburg defeated (Spain) Club de Campo, 8–0, in the final. (Ukraine) MSC Sumchanka took third place.
- February 20 – 22: 2015 Women's EuroHockey Indoor Club Trophy in (Austria) Vienna
  - Winner: (Austria) SV Arminen (26 points, with a GD of 14)
  - Second: (Belarus) HC Ritm-Azot Grodno (26 points, with a GD of 11)
  - Third: (Switzerland) HC Rotweiss Wettingen (22 points)
- February 20 – 22: 2015 Women's EuroHockey Indoor Club Challenge I in (Turkey) Ankara
  - Winner: (Denmark) Slagelse HC (25 points)
  - Second: (Turkey) Keçiören Bağlum SK (21 points)
  - Third: (Bulgaria) HC NSA Sofia (16 points)
- April 1 – 6: EuroHockey League 2014–2015 KO16 and Final Four in (Netherlands) Bloemendaal
  - (Netherlands) MHC Oranje Zwart defeated (Germany) UHC Hamburg, 6–5, in a shoot-out and after a score of 2–2 in regular play, to claim their first EuroHockey League title. (Netherlands) HC Bloemendaal took third place.
- April 3 – 6: 2015 Women's EuroHockey Club Champions Cup in (Netherlands) Bilthoven
  - (Netherlands) SCHC defeated fellow Dutch team, HC 's-Hertogenbosch, 3–2 in a shoot-out and after a score of 2–2 in regular play, in the final. (Spain) Club de Campo took third place.
- May 21 – 24: 2015 Women's EuroHockey Club Champions Trophy in (Belarus) Minsk
  - (Germany) UHC Hamburg defeated (Belgium) Royal Wellington THC, 10–1, in the final. (Belarus) HC Minsk took third place.
- May 22 – 25: 2015 Men's EuroHockey Club Champions Trophy in (Republic of Ireland) Dublin
  - (Belarus) SC Stroitel Brest defeated (Czech Republic) SK Slavia Praha, 3–1, in the final. (Azerbaijan) Atasport took third place.
- July 19–25: 2015 EuroHockey U18 Championships for Boys and Girls in Santander
  - Boys: Germany defeated the Netherlands, 7–1, in the final. Spain took third place.
  - Girls: The Netherlands defeated Germany, 6–1, in the final. England took third place.
- August 21–30: 2015 EuroHockey Nations Championship for Men and Women in (United Kingdom) London
  - Men: The Netherlands defeated Germany, 6–1, to win their fourth Men's EuroHockey Nations Championship title. Ireland took third place.
  - Women: England defeated the Netherlands, 3–1 in penalties and after a 2–2 score in regular play, to win their second Women's EuroHockey Nations Championship title. Germany took third place.

=== Asian Hockey Federation (AsHF) ===
- May 11 – 17: 2015 Men's Indoor Hockey Asia Cup in Taldykorgan
  - Iran defeated Kazakhstan, 9–2, to win their sixth consecutive Men's Indoor Asia Cup title. Uzbekistan took third place.
- August 10–16: 2015 Women's Indoor Asia Cup in Nakhon Ratchasima
  - Kazakhstan defeated Thailand, 4–2, to win their fourth consecutive Women's Indoor Asia Cup title. Uzbekistan took third place.
- September 5–13: 2015 Women's Junior Asia Cup in Changzhou
  - China defeated Japan, 3–1 in a shoot-out and after a 2–2 score in regular play, to win their third Women's Junior Asia Cup title. South Korea took third place.
- November 14–22: 2015 Men's Junior Asia Cup in (Malaysia) Kuantan
  - India defeated Pakistan, 6–2, to win their third Men's Junior Asia Cup title. South Korea took third place.
- December 1–6: 2015 Girls U18 AHF Cup in Bangkok (debut event)
  - Thailand defeated Chinese Taipei in the final. Cambodia took third place.
- December 13–19: 2015 Men's Asian Challenge in Yangon
  - Winner: China (9 points) (first Men's Asian Challenge title)
  - Second: Chinese Taipei (6 points)
  - Third: Myanmar (3 points)
- December 21–28: 2015 Women's Asian Challenge in Bangkok
  - Thailand defeated North Korea, 2–0, in the final. Hong Kong took the bronze medal.

=== Pan American Hockey Federation (PAHF) ===
- October 3–11: Pan American Challenge 2015 for Men and Women in Chiclayo
  - Men: Brazil defeated Venezuela, 1–0, in the final. Uruguay took third place.
  - Women: Brazil defeated Barbados, 3–1, in the final. Peru took third place.

=== Oceania Hockey Federation (OHF) ===
- October 17–25: 2015 Oceania Cup for Men and Women in Stratford, New Zealand
  - Men: Australia defeated New Zealand, 3–2, to win their nine straight Men's Oceania Cup title. Fiji took the bronze medal.
  - Women: Australia defeated New Zealand, 2–1 in a shootout and after a 1–1 score in regular play, to win their second consecutive and sixth overall Women's Oceania Cup title. Samoa took the bronze medal.

=== African Hockey Federation (AfHF) ===
- October 24 – November 1: 2015 Hockey African Cup for Nations for Men and Women in Johannesburg
  - Men: South Africa defeated Egypt, 4–2, to win their seventh consecutive Hockey African Cup for Nations title. Kenya took third place.
  - First (women): South Africa (sixth consecutive Women's Hockey African Cup for Nations title)
  - Second (women): Ghana
  - Third (women): Kenya

== Floorball ==
- Women's World Floorball Championships
  - Champion: Sweden
- Men's under-19 World Floorball Championships
  - Champion: Finland
- Champions Cup
  - Men's champion: (Sweden) IBF Falun
  - Women's champion: (Sweden) KAIS Mora IF

== Goalball ==
- July 5–12: 2015 IBSA Goalball European Championships Men & Women (A Division) in Kaunas
  - Men: Turkey defeated Finland, 9–8, in the men's final match. Lithuania won the bronze medal.
  - Women: Turkey defeated Russia, 5–0, in the women's final match. Ukraine won the bronze medal.
- July 26 – August 1: 2015 IBSA World Youth Games Goalball Championships in Colorado Springs, Colorado
  - Boys: Germany defeated Sweden, 12–2, in the boys' final match. The United States won the bronze medal.
  - Girls: Canada defeated the United States, 4–3, in the girls' final match. China won the bronze medal.
- November 5–13: 2015 IBSA Goalball Asia/Pacific Championships in Hangzhou
  - Men: China defeated Iran, 8–4, in the final. South Korea took the bronze medal.
  - Women: Japan defeated China, 1–0, in the final. Australia took the bronze medal.

== Golf ==
Men's major golf championships

- April 9 – 12: 2015 Masters Tournament
  - Winner: (United States) Jordan Spieth (first Major title; 3rd PGA Tour win)
- June 18–21: 2015 U.S. Open
  - Winner: (United States) Jordan Spieth (second Major title; 4th PGA Tour win)
- July 16–20: 2015 Open Championship
  - Winner: (United States) Zach Johnson (first Open Championship title; second Major title; 12th PGA Tour win)
- August 13–16: 2015 PGA Championship
  - Winner: (Australia) Jason Day (first Major title; 5th PGA Tour win)

WGC

- March 5–8, 2015: 2015 WGC-Cadillac Championship
  - Winner: (United States) Dustin Johnson (second WGC title; first WGC-Cadillac Championship title; 10th PGA Tour win)
- April 29 – May 3, 2015: 2015 WGC-Cadillac Match Play
  - Winner: (Northern Ireland) Rory McIlroy (second WGC championship; first WGC-Match Play championship; 10th PGA Tour win)
- August 6–9, 2015: 2015 WGC-Bridgestone Invitational
  - Winner: (Republic of Ireland) Shane Lowry (first WGC championship and PGA Tour win)
- November 5–8, 2015: 2015 WGC-HSBC Champions
  - Winner: (Scotland) Russell Knox (first WGC championship, and PGA Tour and European Tour win)

Other men's golf events

- May 21 – 24: 2015 BMW PGA Championship (European Tour)
  - Winner: (South Korea) An Byeong-hun (second Professional win; first European Tour title)
- August 27 – September 27: 2015 FedEx Cup Playoffs
  - August 27–30: The Barclays Winner: (Australia) Jason Day
  - September 4–7: Deutsche Bank Championship Winner: (United States) Rickie Fowler
  - September 17–20: BMW Championship Winner: (Australia) Jason Day
  - September 24–27: The Tour Championship Winner: (United States) Jordan Spieth
- October 8–11: 2015 Presidents Cup in (South Korea) Incheon
  - Team United States defeated Team International, 15½ to 14½ points, to win their sixth consecutive and ninth overall Presidents Cup title.

Women's major golf championships

- April 2 – 5: 2015 ANA Inspiration (renamed from Kraft Nabisco Championship)
  - Winner: (United States) Brittany Lincicome (second ANA Inspiration and major titles wins; sixth LPGA Tour win)
- June 11–14: 2015 KPMG Women's PGA Championship (renamed from Wegmans LPGA Championship)
  - Winner: (South Korea) Inbee Park (third straight Women's PGA Championship title win; sixth major win; 15th LPGA Tour win)
- July 9–12: 2015 U.S. Women's Open
  - Winner: (South Korea) Chun In-gee (first major, U.S. Women's Open title, and first LPGA Tour win)
- July 30 – August 2: 2015 Women's British Open
  - Winner: (South Korea) Inbee Park (first Women's British Open title; seventh major win; 16th LPGA Tour win)
- September 10–13: 2015 Evian Championship
  - Winner: (New Zealand) Lydia Ko (first major title; 9th LPGA Tour win)

== Handball ==
=== World handball championships ===
- January 15 – February 1: 2015 World Men's Handball Championship in Qatar
  - France defeated Qatar, 25–22, to win their fifth World Men's Handball Championship title. Poland took the bronze medal.
- June 20–26: 2015 IHF Emerging Nations Championship in Pristina and Gjakova (debut event)
  - The Faroe Islands defeated Latvia, 27–24, to win the inaugural IHF Emerging Nations Championship title. Kosovo took third place.
- July 19 – August 1: 2015 Men's Junior World Handball Championship in Brazil
  - France defeated Denmark, 26–24, to win their first Men's Junior World Handball Championship title. Germany took the bronze medal.
- August 8–20: 2015 Men's Youth World Handball Championship in Russia
  - France defeated Slovenia, 33–26, to win their first Men's Youth World Handball Championship title. Iceland took the bronze medal.
- December 5–20: 2015 World Women's Handball Championship in Denmark
  - Norway defeated the Netherlands, 31–23, to win their third World Women's Handball Championship title. Romania took the bronze medal.

=== European Handball Federation (EHF) ===
- September 5, 2014 – May 17, 2015: 2014–15 EHF Cup
  - (Germany) Füchse Berlin defeated fellow German team, HSV Hamburg, 30–27, to win their first EHF Cup title. (Denmark) Skjern Håndbold took third place.
- September 5, 2014 – May 31, 2015: 2014–15 EHF Champions League
  - (Spain) Barcelona defeated (Hungary) MKB Veszprém, 28–23, to win their ninth EHF Champions League title. (Poland) Vive Targi Kielce took third place.
- September 20, 2014 – May 10, 2015: 2014–15 Women's EHF Champions League
  - (Montenegro) Budućnost defeated (Norway) Larvik HK, 26–22, to win their second Women's EHF Champions League title. (North Macedonia) Vardar took third place.
- October 17, 2014 – May 10, 2015: 2014–15 Women's EHF Cup
  - (Denmark) Team Tvis Holstebro defeated (Russia) Rostov-Don, 55–53, to win their second Women's EHF Cup title.
- October 18, 2014 – May 10, 2015: 2014–15 Women's EHF Cup Winners' Cup
  - (Denmark) Midtjylland defeated (France) Fleury Loiret HB, 46–42, to win their first Women's EHF Cup Winners' Cup title.
- November 14, 2014 – May 13, 2015: 2014–15 Women's EHF Challenge Cup
  - (France) Mios Biganos defeated (Poland) Pogoń Baltica Szczecin, 49–44, to win their second Women's EHF Challenge Cup title.
- November 21, 2014 – May 24, 2015: 2014–15 EHF Challenge Cup
  - (Romania) HC Odorheiu Secuiesc defeated (Portugal) ABC Braga, 60–57 on aggregate, to win their first EHF Challenge Cup title.
- June 26 – July 5: 2015 European Beach Handball Championship in Lloret de Mar
  - Men: Croatia defeated Spain, 2–1, to win their fourth consecutive European Beach Handball Championship title. Ukraine took third place.
  - Women: Hungary defeated Norway, 2–1, to win their second consecutive Women's European Beach Handball Championship. Italy took third place.
- July 27 – August 2: 2015 European Women's Junior Handball Championship in Spain
  - Denmark defeated Russia, 29–26, to win their fourth European Women's Junior Handball Championship title. Sweden took third place.
- August 13–23: 2015 European Women's Youth Handball Championship in (North Macedonia) Skopje
  - Denmark defeated Russia, 25–24, to win their third European Women's Youth Handball Championship title. Hungary took third place.

=== Asian Handball Federation (AHF) ===
- March 14–23: 2015 Asian Women's Handball Championship in (Indonesia) Jakarta
  - South Korea defeated Japan, 36–22, to win their 12th Asian Women's Handball Championship title. China took third place.
- May 1 – 7: 2015 Asian Men's and Women's Beach Handball Championship in Muscat, Oman
  - Men's team winners: Qatar (4 wins) (Third consecutive Asian Men's Beach Handball Championship title)
  - Women's team winners: Thailand (4 wins) (Second consecutive Asian Women's Beach Handball Championship title)
- August 6–14: 2015 Asian Women's Junior Handball Championship in Almaty
  - South Korea defeated Japan, 30–29, to win their 13th consecutive Asian Women's Junior Handball Championship title. Kazakhstan took third place.
- August 27 – September 4: 2015 Asian Women's Youth Handball Championship in (India) New Delhi
  - South Korea defeated Japan, 27–22, to win their sixth consecutive Asian Women's Youth Handball Championship title. China took third place.
- December 12–22: 2015 Asian Handball Club League Championship (location TBA)

=== African Handball Confederation (CAHB) ===
- May 14: 2015 African Handball Super Cup in (Gabon) Libreville
  - (Tunisia) Club Africain defeated fellow Tunisian handball team, the Espérance Sportive de Tunis, 26–22.
- May 14 – 25: 2015 African Handball Cup Winners' Cup in (Gabon) Libreville
  - (Tunisia) Espérance Sportive de Tunis defeated (Egypt) Al Ahly SC, 27–26, to win their second consecutive and third overall African Handball Cup Winners' Cup title. (Tunisia) Club Africain Handball Team took third place.
- May 15: 2015 African Women's Handball Super Cup in (Gabon) Libreville
  - (Angola) C.D. Primeiro de Agosto defeated fellow Angolan team, the Atlético Petróleos de Luanda, 32–28.
- May 15–24: 2015 African Women's Handball Cup Winners' Cup in (Gabon) Libreville
  - (Angola) C.D. Primeiro de Agosto defeated (Ivory Coast) Africa Sports, 36–22, to win their first African Women's Handball Cup Winners' Cup title. (Republic of the Congo) ABO Sport took third place.
- July 1–9: 2015 African Women's Youth Handball Championship in (Kenya) Nairobi
  - Egypt defeated Angola, 32–26, to win their first African Women's Youth Handball Championship title. The Democratic Republic of the Congo took third place.
- July 11–18: 2015 African Women's Junior Handball Championship in (Kenya) Nairobi
  - First place: Angola (11 points; GD: +74) (eighth African Women's Junior Handball Championship title)
  - Second place: Tunisia (11 points; GD: +72)
  - Third place: Egypt (6 points)
- October 21–30: 2015 African Handball Champions League for Men and Women in (Morocco) Nador
  - Men: (Egypt) Zamalek SC defeated (Tunisia) Club Africain, 35–22, to win their ninth African Handball Champions League title. (Egypt) Alexandria Sporting Club took third place.
  - Women: (Angola) C.D. Primeiro de Agosto defeated fellow Angolan team, the Atlético Petróleos de Luanda, 23–21, to win their second consecutive African Women's Handball Champions League title. (Cameroon) FAP Yaoundé took third place.

=== Pan-American Team Handball Federation (PATHF) ===
- March 24–28: 2015 Pan American Men's Junior Handball Championship in Foz do Iguaçu
  - Brazil defeated Argentina, 34–23, to win their fifth Pan American Men's Junior Handball Championship title. Chile took third place.
- March 30 – April 5: Women's Handball PATHF North American Championship 2015 in (Puerto Rico) Salinas
  - Cuba defeated Mexico, 34–25, in the final. United States took third place.
- April 21 – 25: 2015 Pan American Men's Youth Handball Championship in (Venezuela) San Cristóbal
  - Brazil defeated Argentina, 30–20, to win their fifth Pan American Men's Youth Handball Championship title. Chile took third place.
- May 20– 24: 2015 Pan American Men's Club Handball Championship in (Brazil) Taubaté
  - (Brazil) Handebol Taubaté defeated fellow Brazilian team, the EC Pinheiros, 26–20, to win their third Pan American Men's Club Handball Championship title. (Argentina) River Plate took third place.
- May 21 – 28: 2015 Pan American Women's Handball Championship in Havana
  - Brazil defeated Cuba, 26–22, to win their ninth Pan American Women's Handball Championship title. Argentina took third place.

=== Oceania Continent Handball Federation (OCHF) ===
- June 6–8: 2015 Oceania Handball Champions Cup in (Australia) Sydney
  - (Australia) Sydney University HC defeated fellow Australian team, St Kilda HC, 23–16, to win their fourth consecutive Oceania Handball Champions Cup title. (New Caledonia) AS Dumbea took third place.

=== IHF Super Globe ===
- September 7–10: 2015 IHF Super Globe in (Qatar) Doha
  - (Germany) Füchse Berlin defeated (Hungary) MKB Veszprém, 28–27 at extra time, to win their first IHF Super Globe title. (Spain) FC Barcelona took third place.

== Mixed martial arts ==
- January 3: UFC 182: Jon Jones defeated Daniel Cormier in (United States) Las Vegas
- January 31: UFC 183: (Brazil) Anderson Silva defeated Nick Diaz in (United States) Las Vegas
- February 28: UFC 184: Ronda Rousey defeated Cat Zingano in (United States) Los Angeles
- March 14: UFC 185: (Brazil) Rafael dos Anjos defeated Anthony Pettis in (United States) Dallas
- April 25: UFC 186: Demetrious Johnson defeated (Japan) Kyoji Horiguchi in (Canada) Montreal
- May 23: UFC 187: Daniel Cormier defeated Anthony Johnson in (United States) Las Vegas
- June 13: UFC 188: (Brazil) Fabrício Werdum vs Cain Velasquez in Mexico City
- July 11: UFC 189: (Brazil) José Aldo vs (Republic of Ireland) Conor McGregor in (United States) Las Vegas
- August 1: UFC 190: Ronda Rousey vs (Brazil) Bethe Correia in (Brazil) Rio de Janeiro

== Multi-sport events ==
- January 31 – February 8: 2015 Winter World Masters Games in (Canada) Quebec City
  - For results, click here.
- February 4–14: 2015 Winter Universiade in (Slovakia) Štrbské Pleso/Osrblie and (Spain) Granada
- Note: Four sports would be contested in Slovakia from January 24 – February 1, due to little confidence by the FISU about Granada hosting these events.
  - (Slovakia) Štrbské Pleso / Osrblie venue: Russia won both the gold and overall medal tallies.
  - (Spain) Granada venue: Russia won both the gold and overall medal tallies.
- March 28 – April 5: 2015 Winter Deaflympics in Khanty-Mansiysk
  - Host nation, Russia, won both the gold and overall medal tallies.
- May 8–18: 2015 IBSA World Championships and Games in (South Korea) Seoul
  - Russia won both the gold and overall medal tallies.
- June 1–6: 2015 Games of the Small States of Europe in Reykjavík
  - Host nation, Iceland, won both the gold and overall medal tallies.
- June 5–16: 2015 Southeast Asian Games in Singapore
  - Thailand won the gold medal tally. Host nation, Singapore, won the overall medal tally.
- June 12–28: 2015 European Games in (Azerbaijan) Baku (debut event)
  - Russia won both the gold and overall medal tallies.
- June 26 – July 5: 2015 World Police and Fire Games in Fairfax County, Virginia
  - The United States won both the gold and overall medal tallies.
- June 27 – July 3: 2015 Island Games in Jersey
  - Host island, Jersey, won both the gold and overall medal tallies.
- July 2–8: 2015 IWAS World Junior Games in (Netherlands) Stadskanaal
  - For results, click here.
- July 3–14: 2015 Summer Universiade in Gwangju
  - South Korea won the gold medal tally. Russia won the overall medal tally.
- July 4–18: 2015 Pacific Games in Port Moresby
  - Papua New Guinea won both the gold and overall medal tallies.
- July 10–26: 2015 Pan American Games in (Canada) Toronto
  - The United States won both the gold and overall medal tallies.
- July 25 – August 2: 2015 Special Olympics World Summer Games in (United States) Los Angeles
  - For results, click here.
- August 1–9: 2015 Indian Ocean Island Games in (France) Saint-Denis, Réunion
  - (France) Réunion won both the gold and overall medal tallies.
- August 7–15: 2015 Parapan American Games in (Canada) Toronto
  - Brazil won both the gold and overall medal tallies.
- August 7–16: 2015 CPISRA World Games in Nottingham
  - England won both the gold and overall medal tallies.
- August 28 – September 6: 2015 Mediterranean Beach Games in Pescara (debut event)
  - Italy won both the gold and overall medal tallies.
- September 4–19: 2015 All-Africa Games in (Republic of the Congo) Brazzaville
  - Egypt won both the gold and overall medal tallies.
- September 5–11: 2015 Commonwealth Youth Games in (Samoa) Apia
  - Australia won both the gold and overall medal tallies.
- September 26 – October 3: 2015 IWAS World Games in Sochi
  - Russia won both the gold and overall medal tallies.
- October 1–10: 2015 European Masters Games in (France) Nice
  - For results, click here.
- October 2–11: 2015 Military World Games in (South Korea) Mungyeong
  - Russia won both the gold and overall medal tallies.
- December 3–9: 2015 ASEAN Para Games in Singapore
  - Thailand won both the gold and overall medal tallies.

== Netball ==
International tournaments

Date	Tournament	Winners	Runners up
14–17 May	2015 Netball Europe Open Championships	England	South Africa
14–16 May	2015 Netball Europe Open Challenge	Republic of Ireland	Switzerland
31 May–7 June	2015 SEA Games	Singapore	Malaysia
16–19 June	2015 Diamond Challenge	South Africa	Malawi
13–18 July	2015 Pacific Games	Fiji	Papua New Guinea
23–28 July	2015 Taini Jamison Trophy Series	New Zealand	South Africa
7–16 August	2015 Netball World Cup	Australia	New Zealand
20–30 October	2015 Constellation Cup	Australia	New Zealand
14–20 December	2015 Asian Youth Netball Championship	Sri Lanka	Malaysia

Major leagues

Host	League	Winners	Runners up
Australia/New Zealand	ANZ Championship	Queensland Firebirds	New South Wales Swifts
United Kingdom	Netball Superleague	Surrey Storm	Hertfordshire Mavericks

== Roller sport ==
- May 28 & 29: 2015 Inline Hockey World Masters Cup in (Germany) Düsseldorf
  - Winners: Czech Republic
- June 20 & 21: 2015 Inline Downhill World Championships in (Italy) Cisterna d'Asti
  - Men's time trial winner: (Italy) Angelo Vecchi
  - Women's time trial winner: (France) Séverine Christ Thomas
  - Men's Cross winner: (Switzerland) Christian Montavon
  - Women's Cross winner: (Germany) Annalena Rettenberger
- June 7–13: Men's Inline Hockey FIRS Junior World Championship 2015 in (Argentina) Rosario
  - Men's winners: Czech Republic
  - Women's winners: Czech Republic
  - Men's Junior winners: Czech Republic
- June 20–27: 2015 Rink Hockey "A" World Championship in (France) La Roche-sur-Yon
  - In final Spain defeated Argentina 6–1. Portugal took third place.
- August 21–23: Women's Flat Track Derby Association Division 2 Tournament in (United States) Cleveland, Ohio
  - Hosts: Burning River Roller Derby
  - Qualifying tournament for the WFTDA International Championships in St. Paul, Minnesota
  - Qualifying to advance: (United States) Demolition City Dynamite Dames, (United States) Kansas City Roller Warriors.
- August 28–30: Women's Flat Track Derby Association Division 2 Tournament in (United States) Detroit, Michigan
  - Hosts: Detroit Derby Girls
  - Qualifying tournament for the WFTDA International Championships in St. Paul, Minnesota
  - Qualifying to advance: (United States) Sacred City Sacrificers, (United States) Music City All-Stars.
- September 4–6: Women's Flat Track Derby Association Division 1 Tournament in (United States) Tucson, Arizona
  - Hosts: Tucson Roller Derby
  - Qualifying tournament for the WFTDA International Championships in St. Paul, Minnesota
  - Qualifying to advance: (United States) Arch Rival All-Stars, (United States) Bay Area All-Stars, (Australia) Victorian Roller Derby League.
- September 11–13: Women's Flat Track Derby Association Division 1 Tournament in (United States) Dallas, Texas
  - Hosts: Dallas Derby Devils
  - Qualifying tournament for the WFTDA International Championships in St. Paul, Minnesota
  - Qualifying to advance: (United States) Rat City All-Stars, (United States) Texas Texecutioners, (United States) Rose City Wheels of Justice.
- September 17–26: Roller Skating FIRS Artistic World Championships 2015 in (Colombia) Cali
  - Italy won both the gold and overall medal tallies.
- September 18–20: Women's Flat Track Derby Association Division 1 Tournament in (United States) Jacksonville, Florida
  - Hosts: Jacksonville Rollergirls
  - Qualifying tournament for the WFTDA International Championships in St. Paul, Minnesota
  - Qualifying to advance: (United States) Denver Roller Derby Mile-High Club, (United States) New Jax City All-Stars, (United Kingdom) London Brawling.
- September 19–26: 2015 Rink Hockey "U20" World Championship in Vilanova i la Geltrú
  - In the final Portugal defeated Spain 4–3. France took third place.
- October 2–4: Women's Flat Track Derby Association Division 1 Tournament in (United States) Omaha, Nebraska
  - Hosts: Omaha Rollergirls
  - Qualifying tournament for the WFTDA International Championships in St. Paul, Minnesota
  - Qualifying to advance: (United States) Minnesota RollerGirls All-Stars, (United States) Angel City Hollywood Scarlets, (United States) Gotham Girls All-Stars.
- October 26–30: 2015 Inline Freestyle World Championships in (Italy) Turin
  - China won both the gold and overall medal tallies.
- November 6–8: 2015 Women's Flat Track Derby Association International Championships in (United States) Saint Paul, Minnesota
  - Hosts: Minnesota RollerGirls
  - Division 2 results:
    - Bronze: (United States) Demolition City Dynamite Dames, Evansville, Indiana
    - Silver: (United States) Music City All-Stars, Nashville, Tennessee
    - Gold: (United States) Sacred City Sacrificers, Sacramento, California
  - Division 1 results:
    - Bronze: (Australia) Victorian Roller Derby League, Melbourne, Victoria
    - Silver: (United States) Gotham Girls All-Stars, New York City
    - Gold: (United States) Rose City Wheels of Justice, Portland, Oregon
    - Tournament MVP: Scald Eagle of the Rose City Rollers
- November 13–22: 2015 Roller Speed Skating World Championships in (Chinese Taipei) Kaohsiung
  - Colombia won both the gold and overall medal tallies.

== Rugby union ==
- October 10, 2014 – April 3, 2015: 2014–15 British and Irish Cup
  - (England) Worcester Warriors defeated (England) Doncaster R.F.C. 35–5 to win first British and Irish Cup title.
- October 11, 2014 – May 17, 2015: 2014–15 Sevens World Series
  - Fiji winning the Sevens World Series for the 2nd time beating South Africa by 10 points in the overall standings. New Zealand came in third.
- October 17, 2014 – May 2, 2015: 2014–15 European Rugby Champions Cup (final at the (England) Twickenham Stadium)
  - (France) Toulon defeated fellow French team, Clermont, 24–18, to win a third consecutive European club title.
- December 4, 2014 – May 23, 2015: 2014–15 World Rugby Women's Sevens Series
  - New Zealand winning the World Rugby Women's Sevens Series for the third time beating Canada by 12 points in the overall standings. Australia came in third.
- February 5 – March 20: 2015 Six Nations Under 20s Championship
  - Winner: England (8 points); Second: France (6 points and PF of 145); Third: Scotland (6 points and PF of 115)
- February 6 – March 21: 2015 Six Nations Championship
  - Champions: Ireland (13th title)
  - Calcutta Cup winner: England
  - Millennium Trophy winner: Ireland
  - Centenary Quaich winner: Ireland
  - Giuseppe Garibaldi Trophy winner: France
- February 6 – March 22: 2015 Women's Six Nations Championship
  - Champions: Ireland (second title)
  - Triple Crown winner: Ireland
- February 12 – July 4: 2015 Super Rugby season
  - The Highlanders defeated fellow New Zealand team, the Hurricanes, 21–14, to win their first Super Rugby title.
- March 9–23: 2015 World Rugby Pacific Challenge (renamed from IRB Nations Cup)
  - (Argentina) Pampas XV defeated the Fiji Warriors, 17–9, at the final match. Canada A took third place.
- May 12 – 24: 2015 World Rugby Under 20 Trophy in Portugal (renamed from the IRB Junior World Rugby Trophy)
  - Georgia defeated Canada, 49–24, to win their first World Rugby Under 20 Trophy title. Uruguay took third place.
- June 2–20: 2015 World Rugby Under 20 Championship in Italy (renamed from the IRB Junior World Championship)
  - New Zealand defeated England, 21–16, to win their fifth World Rugby Under 20 Championship title. South Africa took third place.
- July 17 – August 8: 2015 Rugby Championship
  - Champions: Australia (fourth title overall, first in Rugby Championship era)
  - Bledisloe Cup winner: New Zealand
  - Freedom Cup winner: New Zealand
  - Mandela Challenge Plate winner: Australia
  - Puma Trophy winner: Australia
  - Also notable is that Argentina finished in third place, marking the first time they had finished above the bottom of the table since entering the competition in 2012.
- July 18 – August 3: 2015 World Rugby Pacific Nations Cup
  - Fiji defeated Samoa, 39–29, to win their third World Rugby Pacific Nations Cup title. Tonga took third place.
- August 7–14: 2015 IWRF Americas Championship (Part of the 2015 Parapan American Games)
  - Canada defeated the United States, 57–54, in the gold medal match. Colombia took the bronze medal.
- September 15–19: 2015 IWRF European Championship in (Finland) Pajulahti
  - Great Britain defeated Sweden, 49–48, to win their fifth IWRF European Championship title. Denmark took the bronze medal.
- September 18 – October 31: 2015 Rugby World Cup in England (final at Twickenham Stadium)
  - New Zealand defeated Australia, 34–17, to win their second consecutive and third overall Rugby World Cup title. South Africa took the bronze medal.
- October 12–16: 2015 World Wheelchair Rugby Challenge in (United Kingdom) London
  - Canada defeated the United States, 54–50, in the final. Australia took the bronze medal.
- October 26 – November 1: 2015 IWRF Asia-Oceania Championship in Chiba
  - Japan defeated Australia, 56–51, to win their first IWRF Asia-Oceania Championship title. New Zealand took the bronze medal.

== Shooting ==
- January 2 – December 6: 2015 ISSF Shooting Calendar

=== ISSF World Cup ===
- February 28 – March 10: World Cup #1 for the Shotgun only in (Mexico) Acapulco
  - Men's Trap winner: (Italy) Massimo Fabbrizi
  - Men's Double Trap winner: (United States) Jeffrey Holguín
  - Men's Skeet winner: (United States) Vincent Hancock
  - Women's Trap winner: (United States) Corey Cogdell
  - Women's Skeet winner: (United States) Kim Rhode
- March 19–29: World Cup #2 for the Shotgun only in (United Arab Emirates) Al Ain
  - Men's Trap winner: (Czech Republic) David Kostelecký
  - Men's Double Trap winner: (Russia) Vasily Mosin
  - Men's Skeet winner: (France) Anthony Terras
  - Women's Trap winner: (Italy) Silvana Stanco
  - Women's Skeet winner: (Italy) Diana Bacosi
- April 8 – 16: World Cup #1 for the Rifle and Pistol in (South Korea) Changwon
  - Men's 10m Air Pistol winner: (South Korea) Jin Jong-oh
  - Men's 10m Air Rifle winner: (Hungary) Péter Sidi
  - Men's 25m Rapid Fire Pistol winner: (France) Jean Quiquampoix
  - Men's 50m Pistol winner: (China) ZHANG Bowen
  - Men's 50m Rifle 3 Positions winner: (China) HUI Zicheng
  - Men's 50m Rifle Prone winner: (United States) Matthew Emmons
  - Women's 10m Air Pistol winner: (Russia) Liubov Yaskevich
  - Women's 10 m Air Rifle winner: (Croatia) Snježana Pejčić
  - Women's 25m Pistol winner: (Mongolia) Otryadyn Gündegmaa
  - Women's 50m Rifle 3 Positions winner: (Croatia) Snježana Pejčić
- April 24 – May 4: World Cup #3 for the Shotgun only in (Cyprus) Larnaca
  - Men's Trap winner: (Czech Republic) David Kostelecký
  - Men's Double Trap winner: (Italy) Antonino Barilla
  - Men's Skeet winner: (United Arab Emirates) Saif Bin Futtais
  - Women's Trap winner: (Finland) Satu Mäkelä-Nummela
  - Women's Skeet winner: (Italy) Diana Bacosi
- May 11–19: World Cup #2 for the Rifle and Pistol in (United States) Fort Benning
  - Men's 10m Air Pistol winner: (South Korea) Jin Jong-oh
  - Men's 10m Air Rifle winner: (Serbia) Milutin Stefanović
  - Men's 25m Rapid Fire Pistol winner: (Germany) Oliver Geis
  - Men's 50m Pistol winner: (Serbia) Damir Mikec
  - Men's 50m Rifle 3 Positions winner: (Kazakhstan) Yuriy Yurkov
  - Men's 50m Rifle Prone winner: (United States) Michael McPhail
  - Women's 10m Air Pistol winner: (Bulgaria) Antoaneta Boneva
  - Women's 10 m Air Rifle winner: (Serbia) Andrea Arsović
  - Women's 25m Pistol winner: (Mongolia) Otryadyn Gündegmaa
  - Women's 50m Rifle 3 Positions winner: (China) CHANG Jing
- May 26 – June 2: World Cup #3 for the Rifle and Pistol in (Germany) Munich #1
  - Men's 10m Air Pistol winner: (Portugal) João Costa
  - Men's 10m Air Rifle winner: (China) Zhu Qinan
  - Men's 25m Rapid Fire Pistol winner: (Germany) Christian Reitz
  - Men's 50m Pistol winner: (Portugal) João Costa
  - Men's 50m Rifle 3 Positions winner: (Germany) Andre Link
  - Men's 50m Rifle Prone winner: (United States) Michael McPhail
  - Women's 10m Air Pistol winner: (Bulgaria) Antoaneta Boneva
  - Women's 10m Air Rifle winner: (China) Yi Siling
  - Women's 25m Pistol winner: (China) ZHANG Jingjing
  - Women's 50m Rifle 3 Positions winner: (Germany) Barbara Engleder
- August 6–16: World Cup for all Three Guns in (Azerbaijan) Gabala
  - Men's 50m Pistol winner: (China) Mai Jiajie
  - Men's 50m Rifle 3 Positions winner: (China) Hui Zicheng
  - Men's 10m Air Rifle winner: (China) Cao Yifei
  - Men's 10m Air Pistol winner: (South Korea) Kim Cheong-yong
  - Men's Skeet winner: (United States) Vincent Hancock
  - Men's Double Trap winner: (United States) Walton Eller
  - Men's 50m Rifle Prone winner: (Russia) Kirill Grigoryan
  - Men's 25m Rapid Fire Pistol winner: (China) Hu Haozhe
  - Men's Trap winner: (Russia) Alexey Alipov
  - Women's 10m Air Rifle winner: (Iran) Elaheh Ahmadi
  - Women's 25m Pistol winner: (China) Cao Lijia
  - Women's 10m Air Pistol winner: (Serbia) Zorana Arunović
  - Women's 50m Rifle 3 Positions winner: (China) Chen Dongqi
  - Women's Skeet winner: (Italy) Katiuscia Spada
  - Women's Trap winner: (Japan) Yukie Nakayama
- September 1–7: World Cup #4 for the Rifle and Pistol (final) in (Germany) Munich #2
  - Men's 10m Air Pistol winner: (Russia) Vladimir Isakov
  - Men's 10m Air Rifle winner: (China) Yang Haoran
  - Men's 25m Rapid Fire Pistol winner: (France) Jean Quiquampoix
  - Men's 50m Pistol winner: (China) ZHANG Bowen
  - Men's 50m Rifle Prone winner: (United States) Michael McPhail
  - Men's 50m Rifle Three Positions winner: (United States) Matthew Emmons
  - Women's 10m Air Pistol winner: (Serbia) Zorana Arunović
  - Women's 10m Air Rifle winner: (Iran) Elaheh Ahmadi
  - Women's 25m Pistol winner: (China) ZHANG Jingjing
  - Women's 50m Rifle Three Positions winner: (Germany) Selina Gschwandtner
- October 15–21: World Cup #4 for the Shotgun only (final) in (Cyprus) Nicosia
  - Men's Skeet winner: (Italy) Gabriele Rossetti
  - Women's Skeet winner: (United Kingdom) Amber Hill
  - Men's Trap winner: (Croatia) Giovanni Cernogoraz
  - Women's Trap winner: (San Marino) Alessandra Perilli
  - Men's Double Trap winner: (United Kingdom) Steven Scott

=== IPC Shooting World Cup ===
- March 30 – November 7: 2015 IPC Shooting World Cup
  - March 30 – April 1: World Cup #1 in (United Kingdom) Stoke Mandeville, Buckinghamshire
    - Great Britain won both the gold and overall medal tallies.
  - April 18 – 21: World Cup #2 in (Poland) Szczecin
    - Ukraine won both the gold and overall medal tallies.
  - May 12 – 15: World Cup #3 in (Turkey) Antalya
    - Great Britain and Slovakia won 6 gold medals each. Great Britain won the overall medal tally.
  - July 10–14: World Cup #4 in (Croatia) Osijek
    - China won both the gold and overall medal tallies.
  - September 15–19: World Cup #5 in (Australia) Sydney
    - South Korea won both the gold and overall medal tallies.
  - November 3–7: World Cup #6 (final) in (United States) Fort Benning
    - Great Britain and South Korea won 3 gold medals each. Great Britain and Ukraine won 6 overall medals each.

=== Other shooting championships ===
- March 2–8: 2015 European 10 m Events Championships in (Netherlands) Arnhem
  - Russia won both the gold and overall medal tallies.
- June 25 – July 2: 2015 ISSF Junior Cup in (Germany) Suhl
  - Russia won both the gold and overall medal tallies.
- July 19 – August 2: 2015 European Shooting Championships in (Slovenia) Maribor
  - Russia won both the gold and overall medal tallies.
- September 9–18: 2015 World Shotgun Championships in Lonato
  - Italy, Russia, and the United States won 4 gold medals each. Italy and the United States won 12 overall medals each.
- September 25 – October 1: 2015 Asian 10 m Events Championships in New Delhi
  - India won both the gold and overall medal tallies.
- November 1–12: 2015 Asian Shooting Championships in Kuwait City
- Note: This event was stripped of the Rio 2016 Olympic Qualification status, per orders from the IOC.
  - South Korea and China won 16 gold medals each. South Korea won the overall medal tally.
- November 25 – December 3: 2015 Oceania Shooting Championships in Sydney
  - Australia won both the gold and overall medal tallies.
- November 28 – December 7: 2015 African Shooting Championships in Cairo
  - Egypt won both the gold and overall medal tallies.

== Snooker ==
=== Players Tour Championship ===
- June 17, 2014 – March 28, 2015: Players Tour Championship 2014/2015
  - June 17–21: Asian Tour 2014/2015 – Event 1 in (China) Yixing
    - (China) Ding Junhui defeated (England) Michael Holt 4–2.
  - August 7–10: European Tour 2014/2015 – Event 1 in (Latvia) Riga
    - (England) Mark Selby defeated (Northern Ireland) Mark Allen 4–3.
  - August 20–24: European Tour 2014/2015 – Event 2 in (Germany) Fürth
    - (Northern Ireland) Mark Allen defeated (England) Judd Trump 4–2.
  - October 1–5: European Tour 2014/2015 – Event 3 in (Bulgaria) Sofia
    - (England) Shaun Murphy defeated (England) Martin Gould 4–2.
  - October 20–24: Asian Tour 2014/2015 – Event 2 in (China) Haining
    - (England) Stuart Bingham defeated (England) Oliver Lines 4–0.
  - November 11–23: European Tour 2014/2015 – Event 4 in (Germany) Mülheim
    - (England) Shaun Murphy defeated (England) Robert Milkins 4–0.
  - December 11–14: European Tour 2014/2015 – Event 5 in (Portugal) Lisbon
    - (Scotland) Stephen Maguire defeated (England) Matthew Selt 4–2.
  - January 20–24: Asian Tour 2014/2015 – Event 3 in (China) Xuzhou
    - (England) Joe Perry defeated (Thailand) Thepchaiya Un-Nooh 4–1.
  - February 25 – March 1: European Tour 2014/2015 – Event 6 in (Poland) Gdynia
    - (Australia) Neil Robertson defeated (Wales) Mark Williams 4–0.
  - March 24–28: Players Tour Championship 2014/2015 – Finals in (Thailand) Bangkok
    - (England) Joe Perry defeated (Wales) Mark Williams 4–3.

=== Snooker season ===
- May 10, 2014 – May 4, 2015: Snooker season 2014/2015
  - May 8–11: 2014 Vienna Snooker Open in (Austria) Vienna
    - (England) Mark King defeated (England) Nigel Bond 5–2.
  - June 4–8: 2014 Pink Ribbon in (England) Gloucester
    - (England) Peter Lines defeated (Wales) Lee Walker 4–1.
  - June 23–29: 2014 Wuxi Classic in (China) Wuxi
    - (Australia) Neil Robertson defeated (England) Joe Perry 10–9.
  - June 30 – July 6: 2014 Australian Goldfields Open in (Australia) Bendigo
    - (England) Judd Trump defeated (Australia) Neil Robertson 9–5.
  - September 1–6: 2014 Six-red World Championship in (Thailand) Bangkok
    - (Scotland) Stephen Maguire defeated (England) Ricky Walden 8–7.
  - September 8–14: 2014 Shanghai Masters in (China) Shanghai
    - (England) Stuart Bingham defeated (Northern Ireland) Mark Allen 10–3.
  - October 10–18: 2014 General Cup in Hong Kong
    - (England) Ali Carter defeated (England) Shaun Murphy 7–6.
  - October 26 – November 2: 2014 International Championship in (China) Chengdu
    - (England) Ricky Walden defeated (Northern Ireland) Mark Allen 10–7.
  - November 3–9: 2014 Champion of Champions in (England) Coventry
    - (England) Ronnie O'Sullivan defeated (England) Judd Trump 10–7.
  - November 25 – December 7: 2014 UK Championship in (England) York
    - (England) Ronnie O'Sullivan defeated (England) Judd Trump 10–9.
  - January 11–18: 2015 Masters in (England) London
    - (England) Shaun Murphy defeated (Australia) Neil Robertson 10–2.
  - February 4–8: 2015 German Masters in (Germany) Berlin
    - (England) Mark Selby defeated (England) Shaun Murphy 9–7.
  - January 5 – February 12: 2015 Championship League in (England) Stock
    - (England) Stuart Bingham defeated (England) Mark Davis 3–2.
  - February 16–22: 2015 Welsh Open in (Wales) Cardiff
    - (Scotland) John Higgins defeated (England) Ben Woollaston 9–3.
  - March 2–3: 2015 World Seniors Championship in (England) Blackpool
    - (Wales) Mark Williams defeated (Republic of Ireland) Fergal O'Brien 2–1.
  - March 4–6: 2015 Snooker Shoot-Out in (England) Blackpool
    - (Wales) Michael White defeated (China) Xiao Guodong 1–0.
  - March 10–14: 2015 Indian Open in (India) Mumbai
    - (Wales) Michael White defeated (England) Ricky Walden 5–0.
  - March 16–22: 2015 World Grand Prix in (Wales) Llandudno
    - (England) Judd Trump defeated (England) Ronnie O'Sullivan 10–7.
  - March 30 – April 5: 2015 China Open in Beijing
    - (England) Mark Selby defeated (England) Gary Wilson 10–2.
  - April 18 – May 4: 2015 World Snooker Championship in (England) Sheffield
    - (England) Stuart Bingham defeated (England) Shaun Murphy 18–15.

== Softball ==
=== Little League World Series (softball) ===
- August 2–19: 2015 Little League World Series Schedule for Softball
  - August 2–8: 2015 Senior League Softball in (Delaware) Sussex County at the Little League Complex
    - Team West ( (Montana) Missoula) defeated Team Central ( (Michigan) Escanaba), 10–0, in the final.
  - August 2–8: 2015 Junior League World Series Softball in (Washington (state)) Kirkland at Everest Park
    - Team Southeast ( Tampa, Florida) defeated Team Asia-Pacific ( (Philippines) Norzagaray, Bulacan), 9–2, in the final.
  - August 2–9: 2015 Big League Softball in (Delaware) Sussex County at the Little League Complex
    - Team Southwest ( Monroe, Louisiana) defeated Team West ( (California) Antelope Valley), 9–1, in the final.
  - August 13–19: 2015 Little League Softball in (Oregon) Portland at the Alpenrose Stadium
    - Team Southeast ( Salisbury, North Carolina) defeated Team East ( Warwick, Rhode Island), 4–2, in the final.

=== International softball ===
- June 26 – July 5: 2015 ISF Men's World Championship in Saskatoon
  - Canada defeated New Zealand, 10–5, to win their first ISF Men's World Championship title. Venezuela took the bronze medal.
- June 29 – July 5: 2015 World Cup of Softball in Irvine, California
  - The United States defeated Japan, 6–1, to win their eighth World Cup of Softball title. Puerto Rico took the bronze medal.
- August 9–15: 2015 ISF Junior Women's World Championship in Oklahoma City
  - The United States defeated Japan, 8–1, to win their fifth ISF Junior Women's World Championship title. Australia took the bronze medal.

== Sport climbing ==
- May 14 – 16: Sport Climbing IFSC Bouldering European Championships 2015 in (Austria) Innsbruck
  - Men's Bouldering winner: (Germany) Jan Hojer
  - Women's Bouldering winner: (Germany) Juliane Wurm
- November 20–22: Sport Climbing IFSC Asian Championships 2015 in (China) Ningbo
  - Women's Lead winner: (South Korea) Kim Ja-in
  - Women's Speed winner: (Indonesia) Tita Suptia
  - Women's Bouldering winner: (Japan) Miho Nonaka
  - Men's Lead winner: (Japan) Keiichiro Korenaga
  - Men's Speed winner: (Indonesia) Galar Pandu Asmoro
  - Men's Bouldering winner: (Japan) Tsukuru Hori

=== 2015 IFSC Climbing World Cup ===
- May 17: IFSC Climbing World Cup #1 in (Canada) Central Saanich
  - Women's Speed winner: (Russia) Iuliia Kaplina
  - Men's Speed winner: (China) Qixin Zhong
- May 30 & 31: IFSC Climbing World Cup #2 in (Canada) Toronto
  - Women's Bouldering winner: (Austria) Anna Stöhr
  - Men's Bouldering winner: (France) Alban Levier
- June 5 & 6: IFSC Climbing World Cup #3 in (United States) Vail
  - Women's Bouldering winner: (United States) Megan Mascarenas
  - Men's Bouldering winner: (Germany) Jan Hojer
- June 20 & 21: IFSC Climbing World Cup #4 in (China) Chongqing
  - Women's Bouldering winner: (Japan) Akiyo Noguchi
  - Men's Bouldering winner: (Canada) Sean McColl
  - Women's Speed winner: (Russia) Mariia Krasavina
  - Men's Speed winner: (China) Qixin Zhong
- June 26 & 27: IFSC Climbing World Cup #5 in (China) Haiyang
  - Women's Bouldering winner: (Switzerland) Petra Klingler
  - Men's Bouldering winner: (South Korea) Jongwon Chon
  - Women's Speed winner: (France) Anouck Jaubert
  - Men's Speed winner: (China) Qixin Zhong
- July 10–12: IFSC Climbing World Cup #6 in (France) Chamonix
  - Women's Speed winner: (France) Anouck Jaubert
  - Men's Speed winner: (Czech Republic) Libor Hroza
  - Women's Lead winner: (Slovenia) Mina Markovič
  - Men's Lead winner: (Spain) Ramón Julián Puigblanque
- July 17 & 18: IFSC Climbing World Cup #7 in (France) Briançon
  - Women's Lead winner: (South Korea) Kim Ja-in
  - Men's Lead winner: (France) Gautier Supper
- July 31 – August 1: IFSC Climbing World Cup #8 in (Austria) Imst
  - Women's Lead winner: (Slovenia) Mina Markovič
  - Men's Lead winner: (France) Romain Desgranges
- August 14 & 15: IFSC Climbing World Cup #9 in (Germany) Munich
  - Finals in Bouldering
    - Women's Bouldering winner: (United Kingdom) Shauna Coxsey
    - Men's Bouldering winner: (Russia) Alexey Rubtsov
- August 21 & 22: IFSC Climbing World Cup #10 in (Norway) Stavanger
  - Women's Lead winner: (Slovenia) Mina Markovič
  - Men's Lead winner: (France) Gautier Supper
- September 26 & 27: IFSC Climbing World Cup #11 in (Belgium) Puurs
  - Women's Lead winner: (South Korea) Kim Ja-in
  - Men's Lead winner: (Slovenia) Domen Škofic
- October 17 & 18: IFSC Climbing World Cup #13 in (China) Wujiang
  - Finals in speed
    - Women's Speed winner: (Russia) Mariia Krasavina
    - Men's Speed winner: (Iran) Reza Alipourshena
    - Women's Lead winner: (South Korea) Kim Ja-in
    - Men's Lead winner: (Czech Republic) Adam Ondra
