= List of Sri Lankans by sport =

The following is a list of Sri Lankan athletes.

== Archery ==
- Shashikala Kumarasinghe
- Dilhara Salgado

== Badminton ==
- Lucky Dharmasena
- Nadeesha Gayanthi
- Thilini Hendahewa
- Thilini Jayasinghe
- Chamika Karunaratne
- Dinuka Karunaratne
- Niluka Karunaratne
- Oshadie Kuruppu
- Lekha Shehani
- Chandrika de Silva
- Kavidi Sirimannage
- Niroshan Wijekoon

== Billiards ==
- Muhammad Lafir

== Boxing ==
- Manju Wanniarachchi

== Carrom ==
- Nishantha Fernando
- Chamil Cooray

== Cricket ==
- Charuka Kahagalla

== Cycling ==
- Maurice Coomarawel

== Golf ==
- Mithun Perera
- Nandasena Perera
- Anura Rohana

== Gymnastics ==
- Anna-Marie Ondaatje

== Karate ==
- Wasantha Soysa

== Netball ==
- Deepika Abeykoon
- Kasturi Chellaraja Wilson
- Gayani Dissanayake
- Chathurangi Jayasooriya
- Nauchalee Rajapakse
- Elilenthini Sethukavalar
- Tharjini Sivalingam
- Dulangi Wannithilake
- Mellony Wijesinghe

== Racing ==
- Ananda Wedisinghe
- Dilantha Malagamuwa

== Swimming ==
- Mathew Abeysinghe
- Julian Bolling
- Cherantha de Silva
- Kimiko Raheem
- Mayumi Raheem

== Table Tennis ==
- Dr. Nimal Lucas

== Track & field athletes ==
- Sriyantha Dissanayake
- Manjula Kumara
- Himasha Eashan
- Sugath Thilakaratne
- Tharushi Karunarathna

== Weightlifting ==
- Sudesh Peiris
- Chinthana Vidanage
