= 2023 Netball World Cup squads =

2023 Netball World Cup squads. This is a list of squads selected for the 2023 Netball World Cup.

== Group A ==
=== Australia ===
Coach: Stacey Marinkovich

Liz Watson (Captain), Sunday Aryang, Kiera Austin, Ash Brazill, Courtney Bruce, Sophie Garbin, Paige Hadley, Sarah Klau, Cara Koenen, Jamie-Lee Price, Jo Weston, Stephanie Wood.

Reserves: Ruby Bakewell-Doran, Kate Moloney, Donnell Wallam

=== Fiji ===
Coach: Unaisi Rokoura

Lydia Panapasa, Unaisi Kubunameca, Maliana Rusivakula, Jimaima Kete, Maria Lutua-Rusivakula, Anaseni Nauqe, Elina Drikibau, Ana Cagi Moi, Ro Kalesi Tawake, Josephine Tabua Adi Vakacegu Bolokoro, Kelera Nawai.

Reserves: Reama Verekauta, Avelina Navue, Navinia Sivo

=== Tonga ===
Coach: Jaqua Pori-Makea-Simpson

Hulita Veve (Captain), Luana Aukafolau, Lose Fainga'anuku, Lucia Fauonuku, Mo'onia Gerrard, Marie Hansen, Kelea Iongi, Beyonce Palavi, Uneeq Palavi, Salote Taufa, Valu Toutaiolepo, Cathrine Tuivati.

Reserves: Jessyka Ngauamo, Silia Setefano, Peti Talanoa

=== Zimbabwe ===
Coach: Ropafadzo Mutsauki

Felistus Kwangwa (Captain), Sharon Bwanali, Beaula Hlungwani, Claris Kwaramba, Nalani Makunde, Sharleen Makusha, Nicole Muzanenhamo, Progress Moyo, Elizabeth Mushore, Joice Takaidza, Takadanaishe Zimusi

Reserves: Ursula Ndlovu, Paidamoyo Tinoza, Tafazwa Mawango

== Group B ==
=== Barbados ===
Barbados roster
Players
Coaches

Pos.	Name	Age - DOB	Ht.	Club	Club nat.
Faye Agard (c)	GS, GK	(aged 37)	1.81 m (5 ft 11 in)			59
Kimani Archer	WD, C		–
Latonia Blackman	WD, GD, GK	6 October 1982 (aged 40)	1.77 m (5 ft 10 in)	Pride of Villa	(Barbados)	181
Carla Boyce	GK, GD	(aged 41)	1.72 m (5 ft 8 in)			0
Kadeen Corbin	GS, GA	27 November 1991 (aged 31)	1.77 m (5 ft 10 in)	Team Bath	(England)	78
Sasha Corbin	WA, C	23 April 1988 (aged 35)	1.70 m (5 ft 7 in)	Saracens Mavericks	(England)	77
Brianna Holder	GS, GA	20 June 2001 (aged 22)	1.68 m (5 ft 6 in)			42
Teresa Howell	C, WD	(aged 27)	1.79 m (5 ft 10 in)			40
Amanda Knight	WA, C, WD	21 April 2000 (aged 23)	1.69 m (5 ft 7 in)			21
Victoria Moverville	GK, GD		–
Tonisha Rock-Yaw (vc)	WD, C	20 August 1993 (aged 29)	1.78 m (5 ft 10 in)			67
Jada Smith	GS, GA		–
Akeena Stoute	GK, GD	(aged 25)	1.74 m (5 ft 9 in)			29
Tamara Trotman	GD, GK	(aged 28)	1.72 m (5 ft 8 in)			9
Damia Walrond	GS, GA	(aged 20)	1.85 m (6 ft 1 in)			4

Head coach

- Denise Alleyne

Notes

- (c) – Captain
- (cc) – Co-captain
- (vc) – Vice-captain
- – Injury / maternity leave
- (TRP) – Temporary Replacement Player

=== England ===
Coach: Jess Thirlby

Natalie Metcalf (Co-captain), Layla Guscoth (Co-captain), Imogen Allison, Eleanor Cardwell, Jade Clarke, Funmi Fadoju, Helen Housby, Laura Malcolm, Geva Mentor, Chelsea Pitman, Olivia Tchine, Fran Williams.

Reserves: Halimat Adio, Amy Carter, Sophie Drakeford-Lewis

=== Malawi ===
Coach: Sam Kanyenda

Jane Chimaliro (Captain), Martha Dambo, Thandi Galeta, Mwai Kumwenda, Takondwa Lwazi, Madalitso Mkandawire, Caroline Mtukule, Joyce Mvula, Grace Mwafulirwa, Lauren Ngwira, Sindi Sintowe, Towera Vinkhumbo.

Reserves: Shabel Bengo, Salome Nkhom, Mma Lepona Manyonyoba

=== Scotland ===
Coach: Tamsin Greenway

Claire Maxwell (Captain), Emily Nicholl, Emma Barrie, Bethan Goodwin, Niamh McCall, Cerys Cairns, Emma Love, Iona Christian, Hannah Leighton, Hannah Grant, Cerys Finn, Rachel Conway.

Reserves: Kelly Boyle, Anna Fairclough, Sarah MacPhail

== Group C ==
=== Jamaica ===
Coach: Connie Francis

Romelda Aiken-George, Shanice Beckford, Kadie-Ann Dehaney, Nicole Dixon-Rochester, Jhaniele Fowler, Crystal Plummer, Rebekah Robinson, Shamera Sterling, Adean Thomas, Jodi-Ann Ward, Khadijah Williams, Latanya Wilson.

Reserves: Shimona Nelson, Kimone Shaw, Abigale Sutherland

=== South Africa ===
South Africa SPAR Proteas roster
Players
Coaches

Name	Pos	DOB	Height	Club	Nat	Caps
Elmeré van der Berg	GS, GA	9 April 2001 (aged 22)	1.91 m (6 ft 3 in)	Leeds Rhinos	(England)	21
Khanyisa Chawane	WD, C, WA	14 January 1996 (aged 27)	1.67 m (5 ft 6 in)	Free State Crinums	(South Africa)	68
Izette Griesel	C,WA	12 July 1992 (aged 31)	1.80 m (5 ft 11 in)	Gauteng Jaguars	(South Africa)	93
Phumza Maweni	GK,GD	4 September 1984 (aged 38)	1.87 m (6 ft 2 in)	Southern Stings	(South Africa)	108
Bongiwe Msomi (c)	C,WA	19 January 1988 (aged 35)	1.66 m (5 ft 5 in)	Gauteng Golden Fireballs	(South Africa)	158
Lenize Potgieter	GS,GA	2 May 1994 (aged 29)	1.88 m (6 ft 2 in)	Manchester Thunder	(England)	89
Karla Pretorius (vc)	GD,WD	12 March 1990 (aged 33)	1.81 m (5 ft 11 in)	Sunshine Coast Lightning	(Australia)	98
Nicola Smith	GK,GD	25 April 2000 (aged 23)	1.88 m (6 ft 2 in)	Southern Stings	(South Africa)	18
Jeanté Strydom	GD,WD	30 September 1996 (aged 26)	1.81 m (5 ft 11 in)	Gauteng Golden Fireballs	(South Africa)	0
Nicholé Taljaard	GA,WA	3 May 1997 (aged 26)	1.77 m (5 ft 10 in)	Southern Stings	(South Africa)	17
Shadine van der Merwe	GD,WD	25 November 1992 (aged 30)	1.79 m (5 ft 10 in)	Manchester Thunder	(England)	66
Sesandile Owethu Ngubane	GS, GA	19 April 2002 (aged 21)	1.81 m (5 ft 11 in)	Gauteng Golden Fireballs	(South Africa)	1
Refiloe Nketsa	WD, C, WA	15 May 1995 (aged 28)	1.75 m (5 ft 9 in)	Free State Crinums	(South Africa)	10
Lefebré Rademan	GA,WA	22 August 1996 (aged 26)	1.72 m (5 ft 8 in)	Free State Crinums	(South Africa)	35
Ine-Marí Venter	GS,GA	21 April 1995 (aged 28)	1.92 m (6 ft 4 in)	Saracens Mavericks	(England)	48

Head coach

- Norma Plummer

Assistant coach

- Dumisani Chauke

Manager:
Nisha Rupnarain
Specialist Coach:
Nicole Cusack

Notes

- (c) – Captain
- (cc) – Co-captain
- (vc) – Vice-captain
- – Injury / maternity leave
- (TRP) – Temporary Replacement Player
Player profiles: Team website
Last updated: 27 August 2024

=== Sri Lanka ===
Coach: Thilaka Jinadasa

Thishala Algama, Semini Alwis, Gayanjali Amarawansa, Rashmi Perera, Dulangi Wannithilake, Malmi Hettiarachchi, Gayani Dissanayake, Chathurangi Jayasooriya, Gayathri Kaushalya, Tharjini Sivalingam, Bhashini Yoshitha De Silva, Shanika Perera.

Reserves: Imasha Perera, Rukshala Hapuarachchi, Chamudi Wickramarathne

=== Wales ===
Coach: Emily Handyside

Nia Jones (Captain), Bethan Dyke, Lucy Howells, Clare Jones, Nansi Kuti, Zoe Matthewman, Shona O'Dwyer, Ella Powell-Davies, Georgia Rowe Christina Shaw, Sarie Watkins, Phillipa Yarranton.

Reserves: Millie Carter, Celyn Emanuel, Abigail Caple

== Group D ==
=== New Zealand ===
2023 New Zealand squad roster
Players
Coaches

Name	Pos	DOB	Height	Club	Nat	Caps
Karin Burger	WD, GD, GK	12 April 1993 (aged 30)	1.84 m (6 ft 0 in)	Mainland Tactix	(New Zealand)	37
Gina Crampton	WA, C	7 December 1993 (aged 29)	1.74 m (5 ft 9 in)	Northern Stars	(New Zealand)	63
Ameliaranne Ekenasio (c)	GS, GA	11 January 1991 (aged 32)	1.86 m (6 ft 1 in)	Waikato Bay of Plenty Magic	(New Zealand)	57
Maddy Gordon	WA, C, WD	16 January 2000 (aged 23)	1.74 m (5 ft 9 in)	Central Pulse	(New Zealand)	6
Kate Heffernan	WD, C, WA	7 October 1999 (aged 23)	1.81 m (5 ft 11 in)	Southern Steel	(New Zealand)	15
Kelly Jury	GK, GD	22 October 1996 (aged 26)	1.92 m (6 ft 4 in)	Central Pulse	(New Zealand)	46
Phoenix Karaka	GK, GD, WD	6 November 1993 (aged 29)	1.86 m (6 ft 1 in)	Northern Mystics	(New Zealand)	50
Grace Nweke	GS	7 February 2002 (aged 21)	1.93 m (6 ft 4 in)	Northern Mystics	(New Zealand)	21
Te Paea Selby-Rickit	GA, GS	14 January 1992 (aged 27)	1.88 m (6 ft 2 in)	Mainland Tactix	(New Zealand)	59
Whitney Souness	WA, C	12 October 1991 (aged 31)	1.74 m (5 ft 9 in)	Central Pulse	(New Zealand)	30
Jane Watson	GK, GD	7 March 1990 (aged 33)	1.81 m (5 ft 11 in)	Mainland Tactix	(New Zealand)	56
Maia Wilson	GS, GA	21 September 1997 (aged 25)	1.87 m (6 ft 2 in)	Northern Stars	(New Zealand)	38
Sulu Fitzpatrick	GK, GD, WD	20 August 1992 (aged 30)	1.88 m (6 ft 2 in)	Northern Mystics	(New Zealand)	27
Tiana Metuarau	GA, GS	15 January 2001 (aged 22)	1.83 m (6 ft 0 in)	Central Pulse	(New Zealand)	6
Mila Reuelu-Buchanan	WA, C	11 May 1998 (aged 25)	1.72 m (5 ft 8 in)	Northern Stars	(New Zealand)	3

Head coach

- Noeline Taurua

Assistant coach

- Debbie Fuller

Manager:
Esther Molloy
Medical Lead:
Dr Melinda Parnell
Physiotherapist: Sharon Kearney
Strength and conditioning: Guy Mothersole
Performance Analyst:
Hayden Croft
Head of High Performance:
Stephen Hotter

Notes

- (c) – Captain
- (cc) – Co-captain
- (vc) – Vice-captain
- – Injury / maternity leave
- (TRP) – Temporary Replacement Player
Player profiles: Team website
Last updated: 17 June 2023

Notes

- Tiana Metuarau, Mila Reuelu-Buchanan and Sulu Fitzpatrick were named as traveling reserves. On 31 July, Silver Ferns goal shooter Grace Nweke was ruled out of the rest of the tournament after suffering a knee injury. Reserve player Tiana Mataurau replaced Nweke in the New Zealand squad.

=== Singapore ===
Coach: Annette Bishop

Toh Kai Wei (Co-captain), Khor Ting Fang (Co-captain), Aqilah Andin, Amandeep Kaur, Angelina Lim, Goh Wei Ping, Jamie Lim, Kimberly Lim, Rachel Ling, Reena Manogaran, Tan Yi Jie, Yew Shu Ning.

Reserves: K Mishalenee, Laura Low, Sherlyn Yip

=== Trinidad and Tobago ===
2023 Netball World Cup – Trinidad and Tobago roster
Players
Coaches

Name	Pos	DOB	Height	Club	Nat	Caps
Alena Brooks	C, WD, WA	14 November 1991 (aged 31)	1.65 m (5 ft 5 in)			11
Tia Bruno	C, WD, WA		1.68 m (5 ft 6 in)	Police	(Trinidad and Tobago)	16
Joelisa Cooper	GS, GA	21 February 1989 (aged 34)	1.80 m (5 ft 11 in)	Fire Service	(Trinidad and Tobago)	104
Tiana Dillon	GS, GA		1.80 m (5 ft 11 in)			15
Oprah Douglas	C, WD, WA		1.66 m (5 ft 5 in)	UTT Patriots	(Trinidad and Tobago)	14
Shaquanda Greene-Noel (cc)	WD, GK, GD	24 November 1993 (aged 29)	1.85 m (6 ft 1 in)	Celtic Dragons	(Wales)	45
Jameela McCarthy	WD, GK, GD	20 June 1995 (aged 28)	1.84 m (6 ft 0 in)			19
Jeresia McEchrane	WD, GK, GD		1.78 m (5 ft 10 in)	Trinidad and Tobago Regiment	(Trinidad and Tobago)	27
Shaniya Morgan	GS, GK		1.88 m (6 ft 2 in)	UTT Patriots	(Trinidad and Tobago)	9
Afeisha Noel (cc)	GS, GA	18 November 1985 (aged 37)	1.91 m (6 ft 3 in)			53
Shantel Seemungal	C, WA		1.65 m (5 ft 5 in)	Police Youth Club	(Trinidad and Tobago)	41
Daystar Swift	GD, GK	7 December 1991 (aged 31)	1.91 m (6 ft 3 in)	UTT Patriots	(Trinidad and Tobago)	61

Head coach

- Joel Young-Strong

Notes

- (c) – Captain
- (cc) – Co-captain
- (vc) – Vice-captain
- – Injury / maternity leave
- (TRP) – Temporary Replacement Player

=== Uganda ===
Coach: Fred Mugerwa

Irene Eyaru (Captain), Mary Cholhok, Christine Namulumba Kango, Shadia Nassanga, Norah Lunkuse, Lillian Achola, Margaret Baagala, Hanisha Muhammad, Stella Nanfuka, Faridah Kadondi, Shaffie Nalwanja.

Reserves: Viola Asingo, Sarah Nakiyunga, Annet Najjuka
