= Vanessa Marie Lee =

Singaporean netball player (born 1983)

Vanessa Lee
Personal information
- Full name: Vanessa Marie Lee
- Born: 24 November 1983 (age 42)
- Occupation: netball player

Netball career
Medal record
Representing Singapore
Women's netball
Asian Netball Championships
Gold medal – first place	2005 Singapore	team
Gold medal – first place	2012 Colombo	team
Silver medal – second place	2018 Singapore	team
Bronze medal – third place	2016 Bangkok	team
Southeast Asian Games
Silver medal – second place	2017 Kuala Lumpur	team
Silver medal – second place	2019 Tagaytay	team

Vanessa Marie Lee also known as Vanessa Lee (born 24 November 1983) is a Singaporean netball player and former captain of the Singapore national team who has been in international circuit since her debut in 2002. She has played at two World Cups in 2011, 2015 and has also represented Singapore at the 2006 Commonwealth Games, 2017 and 2019 SEA Games, and at the Asian Netball Championships. Vanessa Lee is regarded as one of the finest netball players to have emerged from Singapore.

== Netball career ==
Lee retired from international netball in 2012 after winning the 2012 Asian Netball Championships defeating Sri Lanka.

In 2016, Lee returned to the national team after four years to lead the national side.

In 2018, Lee led the team to a silver at the 2018 Asian Netball Championships. After the championship, she decided to take a break and Charmaine Soh replaced her as the captain of the national side. In October, she was inducted into the Singapore Netball's Hall of Fame.

In April 2019, Lee went back to regular training with the national team. She was later appointed as captain of the team for 2019 SEA Games after captain Kimberly Lim tore her Achilles tendon at the Netball Singapore Nations Cup. The team won the silver medal at the SEA Games.
