= 2017 Asian Youth Netball Championship =

Tournament details
- Host country: South Korea
- Dates: 13–13 May 2017
- Teams: 10

Final positions
- Champions: Singapore (2nd title)
- Runner-up: Malaysia
- Third place: Hong Kong

The 2017 Asian Youth Netball Championship was the 10th edition of the tournament. The tournament was played at Jeonju, South Korea from 6 May to 13 May with ten Asian national netball teams.

Singapore defeated Malaysia 47–43 in the final to win the championship.

== Teams ==
Group A	Group B
Sri Lanka	Malaysia
Hong Kong	Singapore
Thailand	Chinese Taipei
Maldives	India
Pakistan	South Korea

== Preliminary round ==
All times are in Korea Standard Time (UTC+09:00). Points allocated will be 2 points for a win, 1 point for a draw, 0 for a loss and -2 for a walkover.

=== Group A ===
Team	P	W	D	L	W/O	GF	GA	GD	Pts	Qualification
Sri Lanka	4	3	0	1	0	287	118	+169	6	First to fourth place classification
Hong Kong	4	3	0	1	0	232	111	+121	6	First to fourth place classification
Thailand	4	3	0	1	0	218	136	+82	6	Fifth to eighth place classification
Maldives	4	1	0	3	0	105	214	-109	2	Fifth to eighth place classification
Pakistan	4	0	0	4	0	24	287	-263	0	Ninth to tenth place classification

6 May 2017; 15:00 KST	Maldives	49–7	Pakistan

6 May 2017; 17:00 KST	Sri Lanka	48–53	Thailand

7 May 2017; 13:00 KST	Hong Kong	75–2	Pakistan

7 May 2017; 19:00 KST	Thailand	60–28	Maldives

8 May 2017; 15:00 KST	Pakistan	6–93	Sri Lanka

8 May 2017; 19:00 KST	Maldives	14–61	Hong Kong

9 May 2017; 15:00 KST	Hong Kong	51–35	Thailand

9 May 2017; 17:00 KST	Sri Lanka	86–14	Maldives

10 May 2017; 13:00 KST	Thailand	70–9	Pakistan

10 May 2017; 13:00 KST	Sri Lanka	60–45	Hong Kong

=== Group B ===
Team	P	W	D	L	W/O	GF	GA	GD	Pts	Qualification
Malaysia	4	4	0	0	0	321	111	+210	8	First to fourth place classification
Singapore	4	3	0	1	0	237	74	+163	6	First to fourth place classification
India	4	2	0	1	1	142	143	-1	2	Fifth to eighth place classification
Chinese Taipei	4	1	0	3	0	140	227	-87	2	Fifth to eighth place classification
South Korea	4	0	0	4	0	60	345	-285	0	Ninth to tenth place classification

6 May 2017; 13:00 KST	South Korea	22–64	Chinese Taipei

6 May 2017; 19:00 KST	India	w/o to Singapore	Singapore

7 May 2017; 15:00 KST	India	20–91	Malaysia

7 May 2017; 17:00 KST	Singapore	108–6	South Korea

8 May 2017; 13:00 KST	Chinese Taipei	35–55	India

8 May 2017; 17:00 KST	Singapore	50–53	Malaysia

9 May 2017; 13:00 KST	South Korea	20–67	India

9 May 2017; 19:00 KST	Malaysia	71–29	Chinese Taipei

10 May 2017; 15:00 KST	Chinese Taipei	15–79	Singapore

10 May 2017; 19:00 KST	Malaysia	106–12	South Korea

== Classification round ==
=== Ninth to tenth place classification ===
==== Ninth and tenth place ====
12 May 2017; 19:00 KST	Pakistan	25–35	South Korea

=== Fifth to eighth place classification ===
==== Bracket ====
5–8th place semifinals
12 May
Thailand	64
Chinese Taipei	39
12 May
India	44
Maldives	27

Fifth place
13 March
Thailand	64
India	30
Seventh place
13 March
Chinese Taipei	51
Maldives	30

==== Crossover ====
12 May 2017; 11:00 KST	Thailand	64–39	Chinese Taipei

12 May 2017; 13:00 KST	India	44–27	Maldives

==== Seventh and eighth place ====
13 May 2017; 09:00 KST	Chinese Taipei	51–30	Maldives

==== Fifth and sixth place ====
13 May 2017; 11:00 KST	Thailand	64–30	India

=== First to fourth place classification ===
==== Bracket ====
Semi-finals
12 May
Sri Lanka	32
Singapore	58
12 May
Malaysia	70
Hong Kong	40

Final
13 March
Singapore	47
Malaysia	43
Third place
13 March
Sri Lanka	49
Hong Kong	58

==== Semi-finals ====
12 May 2017; 15:00 KST	Sri Lanka	32–58	Singapore

12 May 2017; 17:00 KST	Malaysia	70–40	Hong Kong

==== Third and fourth place ====
13 May 2017; 13:00 KST	Sri Lanka	49–58	Hong Kong

==== Final ====
15 May 2017; 15:00 KST	Singapore	47–43	Malaysia

== Final standings ==
Rank	Team
1	Singapore
2	Malaysia
3	Hong Kong
4	Sri Lanka
5	Thailand
6	India
7	Chinese Taipei
8	Maldives
9	South Korea
10	Pakistan
