= Darshika Abeywickrama =

Sri Lankan netball player and banker

Dharshika Abeywickrama
Personal information
- Born: 11 March 1988 (age 38) Balangoda, Rathnapura, Central Province, Sri Lanka
- Occupation(s): netball player, basketball player, banker
- Height: 1.82 m (5 ft 11 1/2 in)

Netball career
- Playing position(s): goal defense, goal keeper
Medal record
Representing Sri Lanka
Asian Netball Championship
Gold medal – first place	2009 Malaysia	Netball
Silver medal – second place	2014 Singapore	Netball
Silver medal – second place	2016 Thailand	Netball
Gold medal – first place	2018 Singapore	Netball

Darshika Abeywickrama also spelt as either Dharshika Abeywickrama or Darshika Abeywickrema (born 11 March 1988) is a Sri Lankan netball player who plays in the positions of goal defense or goalkeeper. She is nicknamed "Bale".

== Biography ==
Dharshika was born as the third child in her family and has five siblings including two elder sisters, two younger sisters and a younger brother. She studied at the St. Agnes' Girls School in Balangoda until Grade 5 and then she later moved to Nugegoda Anula Vidyalaya after the scholarship exam. She also received the opportunity to attend Gateway College due to her sporting skills.

== Career ==
She initially took interest in high jump as a kid and she received her first certificate in high jump when she was studying in Grade 4. She later switched to netball after watching one of her sisters playing the sport. It was revealed that she was urged to join the school netball team when she switched to Anula Vidyalaya. In addition, she also participated in athletic events such as shot put, discus throw and javelin throw at school-level competitions.

She also took up basketball in school sports meet when she was in Grade 9 and was subsequently called up to the Anula Vidyalaya school basketball team. She began playing basketball in the junior category at under 16 level, representing the under 16 school team. She received basketball training from Tharindu Fernando. In 2005, Dharshika was selected to represent Sri Lanka schools basketball team in school level competition.

Prior to being introduced to the game of basketball, she was also selected among a pool of girls to attend a netball training session. Sri Lankan netball manager Trixie Nanayakkara invited her to take part in the selection trial in 2004 when Dharshika was at her home after completing her Ordinary Level Examinations. However, she turned down the offer due to the change in administration of the Sri Lanka Netball Federation and took a brief break from netball. Later, she also rejected an invitation to train for the national basketball team due to her interest in netball. In 2008, she received a phone call from Trixie Nanayakkara who asked her to rejoin the netball training and to join the national team for the 2009 Asian Netball Championship.

She joined the Campbell Netball Club in 2008 and her performances for the club in the domestic competition caught the eyes of the selectors and she was included in the squad for the 2009 Asian Championship. She made her senior international debut for Sri Lanka in 2009 at the Asian Championships where Sri Lanka crowned as champions. She was ruled out of the 2011 World Netball Championships after sustaining a ligament injury just a week before the start of the tournament. She was subsequently sidelined from the national team for two years and returned to the national team in 2013 after recovering from the injury. She was part of Sri Lankan squad which emerged as runners-up to Singapore at the 2014 Asian Netball Championships.

Dharshika made her debut Netball World Cup appearance during the 2015 Netball World Cup where Sri Lanka finished at sixteenth position. She was also a member of Sri Lankan squad which emerged as runners-up to Singapore at the 2016 Asian Netball Championships. She was the vice captain of the Sri Lankan team at the 2018 Asian Netball Championships where Sri Lanka were crowned champions after defeating Singapore 69-50 in the final, which also marked Sri Lanka's first Asian Netball Championships triumph since 2009. She made her second World Cup appearance during the 2019 Netball World Cup where Sri Lanka finished at fifteenth position.

She also currently serves as a banker in addition to her career in sports. She joined the Hatton National Bank in 2010 after accepting a job offer due to her exceptional performance in netball. She has also represented the HNB Bank netball team at mercantile competitions and has also captained the side. She was part of the HNB team which won the 2018 Dialog National Netball Championship. In April 2021, under her captaincy HNB women's netball team won the 2021 Super League Netball Championship defeating Air Force SC 54-37 in the final at the Ratnapura Public Indoor Stadium. She also pursued her Bachelor's degree in Business Management.
