= Elilenthini Sethukavalar =

Sri Lankan netball player (born 1995)

Personal information
- Born: 4 April 1995 (age 31) Jaffna, Sri Lanka
- Occupation(s): netball player, employee
- Height: 1.96 m (6 ft 5 in)

Netball career
- Playing position(s): GK, GS
Medal record
Representing Sri Lanka
Asian Netball Championship
Silver medal – second place	2012 Colombo	Netball
Silver medal – second place	2014 Singapore	Netball
Silver medal – second place	2016 Thailand	Netball
Gold medal – first place	2018 Singapore	Netball

Elilenthini Sethukavalar also spelled as Elilenthinie Sethukavalar also simply known as Elil Sethukavalar (born 4 April 1995) is a Sri Lankan netball player represents Sri Lankan netball team in international netball tournaments and also works as an employee at Citizens Development Business Finance.

== Career ==
She started playing netball in 2013 and her height standing at 196 cm tall, caught the eyes of the selectors which helped her to storm into the national side in 2018. She also became the second player after Tharjini Sivalingam from Jaffna to represent Sri Lanka in international netball.

Elilenthini made her international debut at the 2018 Asian Netball Championships and was a key member of the Sri Lankan contingent which emerged as champions during the tournament beating Singapore 69-50 in the final, which also marked Sri Lanka's first Asian Netball Championships triumph since 2009. She also represented Sri Lanka at the 2019 Netball World Cup, which was also her first World Cup tournament.
