= Chathurangi Jayasooriya =

Sri Lankan netball player

Personal information
- Born: 10 July 1990 (age 35)
- Occupation: netball player
- Height: 1.80 m (5 ft 11 in)

Netball career
- Playing position(s): goal defense, goal keeper
Medal record
Representing Sri Lanka
Asian Netball Championship
Gold medal – first place	2009 Malaysia	Netball
Silver medal – second place	2012 Sri Lanka	Netball
Silver medal – second place	2014 Singapore	Netball
Silver medal – second place	2016 Thailand	Netball
Gold medal – first place	2018 Singapore	Netball

Chathurangi Jayasooriya also spelled as Chathurangi Jayasuriya (born 10 July 1990) is a Sri Lankan netball player and the current captain of the Sri Lanka national netball team who plays in the positions of goal defense or goal keeper. She has been a regular member of the Sri Lankan team since 2011 and took over the captaincy of the national side from fellow veteran Tharjini Sivalingam in 2017. She plays in the position of goal defense and also as the goal keeper. She also currently serves as the flight lieutenant at the Sri Lanka Air Force.

Chathurangi has represented Sri Lanka at three Netball World Cup tournaments in 2011, 2015 and captained the Sri Lankan team at the 2019 Netball World Cup where the team finished at 19th position.

She also led Sri Lanka which became victorious at the 2018 Asian Netball Championships beating Singapore 69-50 in the final, which also marks Sri Lanka's first Asian Netball Championships triumph since 2009.
