= Gayani Dissanayake =

Sri Lankan netball player (born 1994)

Personal information
- Born: 20 April 1994 (age 32) Danthure, Kandy, Sri Lanka
- Occupation: Netball player
- Height: 1.86 m (6 ft 1 in)

Netball career
- Playing position(s): GD, GK
Medal record
Representing Sri Lanka
Silver medal – second place	2012 Colombo	Netball
Silver medal – second place	2014 Singapore	Netball
Silver medal – second place	2016 Thailand	Netball
Gold medal – first place	2018 Singapore	Netball
Gold medal – first place	2022 Singapore	Netball
Silver medal – second place	2024 India	Netball

Gayani Dissanayake (Sinhala: ගයානී දිසානායක) (born 20 April 1994) is a Sri Lankan netball player and a former captain of the Sri Lanka national netball team who plays in the position of goal defense or goal keeper in international netball tournaments. She is the second most capped player for Sri Lanka after veteran Tharjini Sivalingam.

== Career ==
Gayani made her international debut in 2011 after emerging from youth level. She became the vice captain of the national team in 2014 during the 2014 Asian Netball Championships. She continued as the vice captain of the side for the 2015 Netball World Cup, which was also her first World Cup appearance. Gayani was appointed as the captain of the team for a short tenure for the 2016 Asian Netball Championships where Sri Lanka emerged as runners-up to Malaysia.

She was also one of the key members of the Sri Lankan contingent which emerged as champions at the 2018 Asian Netball Championships beating Singapore 69–50 in the final, which also marked Sri Lanka's first Asian Netball Championships triumph since 2009. She was included in the Sri Lankan squad for the 2019 Netball World Cup, which was her second World Cup tournament.
