= Deepika Abeykoon =

Sri Lankan netball player (born 1989)

Personal information
- Born: 17 March 1989 (age 37)
- Height: 1.73 m (5 ft 8 in)

Netball career
- Playing positions: C, GD
Years	National team	Caps
	Sri Lanka	32
Medal record
Representing Sri Lanka
Asian Netball Championship
Gold medal – first place	2009 Malaysia	Netball
Silver medal – second place	2012 Colombo	Netball
Silver medal – second place	2014 Singapore	Netball
Silver medal – second place	2016 Thailand	Netball
Gold medal – first place	2018 Singapore	Netball

Deepika Abeykoon is a Sri Lankan netball player and center, goal defense of the Sri Lankan national netball team. Season held on 12–21 July.
