= Gayanjali Amarawansa =

Sri Lankan netball player

Personal information
- Born: 20 December 1995 (age 30)
- Occupation(s): netball player, basketball player, banker
- Height: 1.65 m (5 ft 5 in)

Netball career
- Playing position(s): centre, wing attack
Medal record
Representing Sri Lanka
Asian Netball Championship
Silver medal – second place	2016 Thailand	Netball
Gold medal – first place	2018 Singapore	Netball
Gold medal – first place	2022 Singapore	Netball

Gayanjali Amarawansa (born 20 December 1995) is a Sri Lankan netball player who plays for the national team in the position of centre. She is also currently employed at the Hatton National Bank and also occasionally plays basketball and netball for her bank in domestic competitions.

== Biography ==
She pursued her primary and secondary education at the Girls High School, Kandy. She was coached by former Sri Lankan cricketer Suwini de Alwis. She has also competed in other sporting disciplines such as gymnastics and athletics at school level.

== Career ==
She missed out on her first national selection in early 2013 after being diagnosed with dengue. However, she was able to recover from dengue and broke into the national senior team in December 2013.

She was a key member of the Sri Lankan squad which won the 2015 Asian Youth Netball Championship and for her notable performances during the course of the competition she was awarded the Best Wing title. She was included in the senior squad for the 2016 Asian Netball Championships where Sri Lanka emerged as runners-up.

She was also part of the Sri Lankan squad which won the 2018 Asian Netball Championships by defeating Singapore 69–50 in the final, which also ensured Sri Lanka's first Asian Netball Championships triumph since 2009.

She was named in the Sri Lankan squad for the 2019 Netball World Cup which also marked her debut appearance in a Netball World Cup tournament.

She was an integral member of the HNB women's netball team which won the 2021 Super League Netball Championship when HNB defeated Air Force SC 54–37 in the final at the Ratnapura Public Indoor Stadium. She was a member of the HNB side which emerged triumphant during the final of the 2022 Women's Mercantile Basketball Tournament.

She was named as the captain of the Sri Lankan netball team for the 2022 Asian Netball Championships which was held in Singapore. She captained the Sri Lankan side to a record sixth Asian Netball Championship title when Sri Lanka defeated hosts Singapore 63-53 during the 2022 Asian Netball Championship final. Thus, Sri Lanka progressed to the 2023 Netball World Cup in South Africa.
