= Netball in Pakistan =

- Country: Pakistan
- National team: Pakistan

Pakistan had a national team compete in the fifth Asian Netball Championship held in Colombo in 2001.

The Pakistan Netball Federation (PNF) is the national governing body of Netball in Pakistan

== Bibliography ==
- Government of Sri Lanka (21 July 2001). "5th Asian Netball Championship next week in Colombo". Archived from the original on 26 January 2004.
- International Federation of Netball Associations (21 January 2011a). "Current World Rankings". Archived from the original on 19 May 2011.
