= Dulangi Wannithilake =

Sri Lankan netball player (born 1994)

Personal information
- Born: 17 October 1994 (age 31) Kurunegala, Sri Lanka
- Occupation(s): netball player, basketball player
- Height: 1.65 m (5 ft 5 in)

Netball career
- Playing position(s): GA, WA
Medal record
Representing Sri Lanka
Asian Netball Championship
Silver medal – second place	2012 Colombo	Netball
Silver medal – second place	2014 Singapore	Netball
Silver medal – second place	2016 Thailand	Netball
Gold medal – first place	2018 Singapore	Netball

Dulangi Wannithilake also spelled as Dulangi Wannithileka (Sinhala: දුලාංගී වන්නිතිලක) (born 17 October 1994) is a Sri Lankan netball player who also is a basketball player and represents Sri Lankan netball team in international netball tournament.

== Early life ==
She was born and raised in Kurunegala. Her father Wannithilake is a former volleyball player and her mother is a netball coach. She started playing netball at U12 level for the Holy Family Convent, Kurunegala before grabbing the opportunity to play for the Sri Lanka U19 netball team.

== Career ==
She was selected for the national team after emerging from the youth level and was part of the Sri Lankan U19 team which won the Asian Youth Netball Championship in 2015. She made her senior international debut in 2018.

She was a member of the Sri Lankan contingent which emerged as champions at the 2018 Asian Netball Championships beating Singapore 69–50 in the final, which also marked Sri Lanka's first Asian Netball Championships triumph since 2009. She also represented Sri Lanka at the 2019 Netball World Cup, which was also her first World Cup tournament.In addition She works as a Banking Professional in Hatton National Bank PLC.
