= Kimberly Lim (netball) =

Singaporean netball player (born 1994)

Personal information
- Full name: Kimberly Lim Wei Yan
- Born: 10 December 1994 (age 31)
- Occupation: netball player
- Height: 1.62 m (5 ft 4 in)

Netball career
- Playing position(s): wing attack, centre
Medal record
Representing Singapore
Women's netball
Asian Netball Championships
Gold medal – first place	2014 Singapore	team
Southeast Asian Games
Gold medal – first place	2015 Kallang	team
Silver medal – second place	2017 Kuala Lumpur	team

Kimberly Lim Wei Yan (born 10 December 1994) is a Singaporean netball player who represents Singapore internationally and plays in the positions of wing attack or centre. She was part of the Singaporean squads during the 2015 Netball World Cup and 2019 Netball World Cup. She was just one of two survivors along with skipper Charmaine Soh in the 2019 World Cup squad to have played in the 2015 World Cup.

== Education ==
Lim studied at the Singapore Sports School.

== Netball career ==
Lim was a member of the Singaporean team which emerged as champions during the 2014 Asian Netball Championships defeating Sri Lanka at home. Lim was also part of the team which won silver at the 2014 Netball Singapore Nations Cup.

Lim was one of the key members of the Singaporean contingent which claimed gold medal in the women's netball event during 2015 Southeast Asian Games and was part of the Singaporean squad which bagged silver at the 2017 Southeast Asian Games.

In September 2019, she was included in the Singaporean squad for the 2019 M1 Nations Cup.
