= Netball in the Maldives =

- Country: Maldives
- National team: Maldives

Maldives had a national team compete in the fifth Asian Netball Championship held in Colombo in 2001.

== Bibliography ==
- Government of Sri Lanka (21 July 2001). "5th Asian Netball Championship next week in Colombo". Archived from the original on 26 January 2004.
- International Federation of Netball Associations (21 January 2011a). "Current World Rankings". Archived from the original on 19 May 2011.
