= Abeykoon =

Abeykoon (Sinhala: අබේකෝන්, romanized: Abēkōn) is a Sinhalese surname. Notable people with the surname include:

- Deepika Abeykoon (born 1989), Sri Lankan netball player
- M. Walter F. Abeykoon, Ceylonese civil servant and Inspector General of Police
- P. B. Abeykoon, Sri Lankan civil servant
- Sampath B. Abeykoon, Sri Lankan puisne justice of the Supreme Court
- Sarath Abeykoon, Sri Lankan academic and politician
- Srilal Abeykoon (1953–2020), Sri Lankan actor and singer
- Yupun Abeykoon (born 1994), Sri Lankan track and field athlete
