= Darshika =

Darshika is both a given name and a surname. Notable people with the name include:

- Darshika Abeywickrama (born 1988), Sri Lankan netball player
- Sanoj Darshika (born 1999), Sri Lankan cricketer
