= Tharjini Sivalingam =

Former Sri Lankan netball player

Personal information
- Born: 30 December 1978 (age 47)
- Occupations: netball player, banking assistant
- Height: 2.10 m (6 ft 10 1/2 in)
- University: Eastern University of Batticaloa

Netball career
- Playing position: GS
Medal record
Representing Sri Lanka
Gold medal – first place	2009 Malaysia	Netball
Gold medal – first place	2018 Singapore	Netball
Gold medal – first place	2022 Singapore	Netball
Silver medal – second place	2012 Sri Lanka	Netball
Silver medal – second place	2014 Singapore	Netball

Tharjini Sivalingam (born 30 December 1978) is a former Sri Lankan veteran netball player and former skipper of the Sri Lankan national netball team. With her staggering height of 210 cm or 6 ft 10.5in, she has been recognized as one of the most successful shooters of all time and often regarded as the tallest netball player ever. She is the most capped international netball player to represent Sri Lanka. She was a regular member of the Sri Lanka national team in international netball tournaments since making her debut in 2009. She is well known for her unusually tall height and considered one of the marquee players in Sri Lankan netball history. She also faced many hardships in her childhood as she grew up in a warzone.

She has represented Sri Lanka at the INF Netball World Cup in 2011, 2015, 2019 and 2023. She has represented Sri Lanka at Asian Netball Championships five times in 2009, 2012, 2014, 2018 and 2022. She became the oldest player to play in the history of the Netball World Cup at the age of 40 when she appeared at the 2019 Netball World Cup. She subsequently broke her own record of being the oldest ever netball player to appear in World Cup when she competed during the 2023 Netball World Cup at the age of 44.

== Biography ==
Tharjini was the fifth of the six children to a family in Evinai, Punnalaikadduvan, Jaffna District. Her father was a chili farmer. While young, she faced discrimination as a result of her height and was also nicknamed as "Genie" due to her height. She pursued her primary education at the Visalam Central College.

She and her family were also affected during the Sri Lankan Civil War with their house being damaged at that time. She and her family moved to Batticaloa at the age of 20. Tharjini Sivalingam is a Bachelor of Arts graduate as she holds a degree in Economics from the Eastern University in Batticaloa.

== Career ==
She was recognized by the former Sri Lankan netball team coach, Thilaka Jinadasa, in 2004 because of her shooting skills at the university level netball championships. Shiranthi Rajapaksa, the wife of former Sri Lankan President Mahinda Rajapaksa who attended as a chief guest to watch a domestic netball match in Vavuniya in 2004 had firmly suggested Tharjini to join the national team after being impressed with her performance during the match. However, Tharjini initially turned down the offer due to her language related issues.

She was selected for the Sri Lankan national netball team in 2009 and since then she has been a regular member. Tharjini was part of the Sri Lankan team which won the 2009 Asian Netball Championships and was also the part of the national team which emerged as runners-up in the 2012 Asian Netball Championships and in the 2014 Asian Netball Championships.

She continued her dream run as she was awarded the title of Best Shooter in the 2011 World Netball Championships for scoring 290 goals in the tournament despite Sri Lanka's first round exit. In 2017, she was sacked from the national side due to the political issues and was replaced by Chathurangi Jayasooriya as the national team captain. She made her way back to the national squad in 2018 with the return of Thilaka Jinadasa as the national coach.

She also serves as a banking assistant at Seylan Bank and represents Seylan Bank in the mercantile netball association tournament as well. She joined Seylan Bank in 2005 and works at the Liability Products Management Department of Seylan Bank.

In 2017, she received a scholarship from the Australian City West Falcons netball club and went on to play for the City West Falcons club, becoming the only Sri Lankan to play for a foreign netball club. She also received Best Shooter of the Year Award as well as Fairest Player of City Falcon Award 2017 for her impressive performances for the club in her debut season.

After returning to Sri Lankan national netball team for the first time since 2015, she played a key role in winning the 2018 Asian Netball Championships being the unbeaten team in the tournament defeating Singapore 69-50 in the final to make it a fifth Asian Championship title for Sri Lanka and their first title since 2009. During the 2018 Asian Championships, Tharjini received the Player of the tournament award for her outstanding aggressive skills.

In July 2019, during the 2019 Netball World Cup Sivalingam made her 100th international appearance for Sri Lanka, becoming the first Sri Lankan to do so. She was the tournament's top-scorer with 348 goals in 375 attempts (scored in seven matches), 44 clear of Jamaica's Jhaniele Fowler and also recorded the most points (77) by a player in a single match at the 2019 Vitality Netball World Cup. In December 2019, she received the Most Popular Sports Personality of the Year Award at the fifth annual SLT SILK Sports Awards.

She made a comeback return to the Sri Lankan national team for the 2022 Asian Netball Championships as she previously retired post the 2019 World Cup. She was granted permission to participate at the 2022 Asian Netball Championships which was held in Singapore and Sri Lanka was able to defend the title defeating Singapore in the final 63-53.

She was named in the Sri Lankan squad at the 2023 Netball World Cup where she made her fourth and final World Cup appearance. She subsequently announced her official international retirement after the 2023 World Cup which was held in South Africa.

== Awards ==
- World's Best Shooter Award - 2011
- Best Asia Shooter Awards - 2009, 2012
- Best Shooter of the Year Award, Fairest Player of City Falcon Award - 2017
- Asian Championship Player of the Tournament - 2018
- SLT Most Popular Sports Personality of the Year Award - 2019
- Sports Icon Award - Maldives Sports Awards 2022
