= Netball Federation of India =

- Sport: Netball
- Jurisdiction: India
- Abbreviation: NFI
- Founded: March, 1978
- Affiliation: International Netball Federation
- Affiliation date: 1978
- Regional affiliation: Asian Federation of Netball Association
- Headquarters: Netball Federation of India
- Location: 15 Pusa Road, New Delhi, India
- President: Suman Kaushik
- Secretary: Vijender Singh
- (India)

Netball Federation of India (NFI) is the national governing body of netball in India. NFI is affiliated with the International Netball Federation (INF), the Asian Federation of Netball Association (AFNA) and the Indian Olympic Association (IOA), recognised by the Ministry of Youth Affairs and Sports. NFI was established in 1978 to standardise rules and regulations of netball in India. NFI operates the India national netball team and youth sides. NFI is responsible for organising netball tournaments within India.

== History ==
The game of netball was introduced in India by evangelist Dr. Harry Crowe Buck of Pennsylvania, United States in 1920 at the YMCA College of Physical Education of Madras. NFI was established in 1978 by Jagat Singh Lohan from Rohtak, Haryana who was an alumnus of YMCA College. In the same year, he organised the first national championships in Jind. NFI and netball associations of Hong Kong, Malaysia, Singapore and Sri Lanka met during the 1983 Netball World Championships to discuss the creation of an Asian netball governing body, which resulted in the establishment of Asian Federation of Netball Associations in 1986 in Kuala Lumpur. NFI affiliates 26 states' governing bodies of netball in India.
