= Ananda Wedisinghe =

Sri Lankan motorcycle racer

- Born: 19 July 1970; Kurunegala
- Died: 29 May 2017 (aged 46); Kandy
- Occupation: Motocross racer
- Years active: 1988–2017

Ananda Wedisinghe (Sinhala: ආනන්ද වෙඩිසිංහ) (1970 – 29 May 2017) was a Sri Lankan motor racer and eight-time Fox Hill Supercross motorcycle national champion of Sri Lanka. He hailed from Kurunegala. He died at the age of 47 due to injuries following a motorcycle crash during a Nuwara Eliya road race on 23 April 2017.

== Legacy ==
Wedisinghe was credited with introducing motor supercross sport in Sri Lanka.

== Early life ==
Wedisinghe was born in 1970 in village in Kurunegala, Sri Lanka. He had a twin brother (who died after birth) and two young brothers (also racers (cars and motos) and a young sister. He grew up watching his father racing. He studied at St. Anne's College, Kurunegala.

== Career ==
Wedisinghe was the founder of "Auto plaza Ananda international (PVT) Ltd" at age 20.

== Family ==
Wedisinghe's father was Siri Wedisinghe, his brother is Wijayanada Wedisinghe, and Ananda Wedisinghe is the nephew of Wijayanada Wedisinghe. Siri Wedisinghe is one of the first motorcycle racers from Sri Lanka to die from a racing accident. Wedisinghe went to Japan in 1988 after his loss with the help of fellow countryman, Dilantha Malagamuwa, and established himself as a motorcycle rider. Wedisinghe married his Japanese wife, Rumi, before returning to Sri Lanka where he started promoting motocross. They had four children, Risa Wedisinghe (b.1991), Kenryuji Wedisinghe (b.1993), Rina Wedisinghe (b.1996) and Jun Wedisinghe (b.1999).

== Death ==
Wedisinghe was in a coma following the accident and at Kandy General Hospital for five weeks until his death on 29 May 2017. His funeral took place at Malkaduwawela cemetery in Kurunegala. He was survived by four children.

== See also ==
List of Sri Lankan sportspeople
