= Netball in Malaysia =

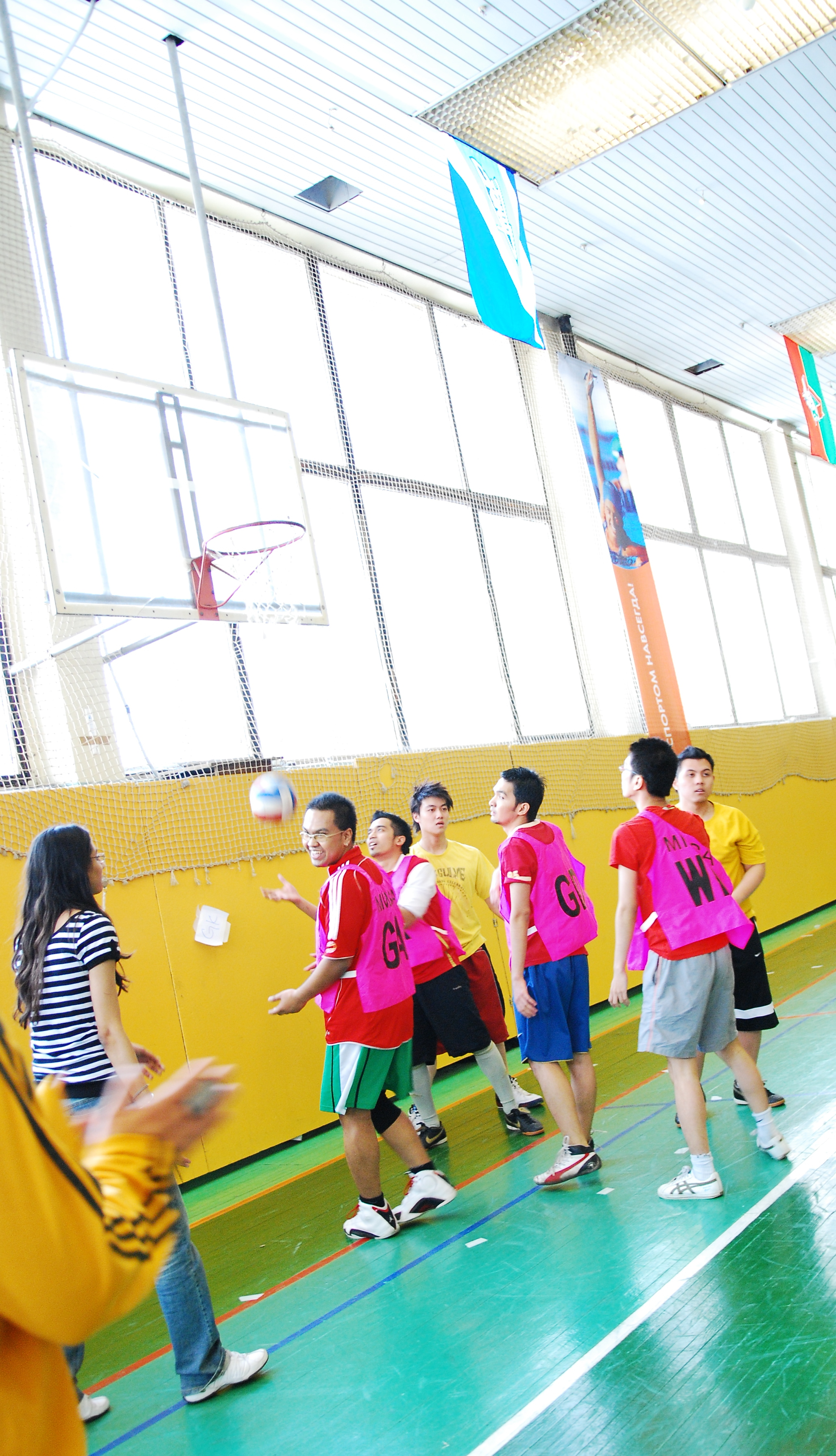
- A men's netball team at Interbatch Games 2009
- Country: Malaysia
- National team: Malaysia

Netball is promoted in Malaysia at the Sport Carnival for All (KESUMA). In 1998, 113 districts held netball competitions. That year, there were 1,718 registered netball teams in the country. In 2001, netball was sufficiently popular in South East Asia for it to be included in the 21st Southeast Asian Games in Kuala Lumpur. Malaysia had a national team compete in the fifth Asian Netball Championships in Colombo in 2001. Malaysia also competed in the 7th Asian Youth Netball Championship in India in 2010. Petronas, the national oil company, has been a major sponsor of netball in the country. This type of sponsorship was encouraged by the government as part of the Rakan Sukan programme.

Important netball competitions held in Malaysia include:

- The 1998 Commonwealth Games

The top performances for the Malaysia national netball team include:

- 2010 Asian Youth Netball Championship: First

As of August 2016, the women's national team was ranked number nineteenth in the world.

== Bibliography ==
- DaCosta, Lamartine P.; Miragaya, Ana (2002). Worldwide experiences and trends in sport for all. Meyer & Meyer Sport. ISBN 1-84126-085-1. OCLC 248362122.
- Government of Sri Lanka (21 July 2001). "5th Asian Netball Championship next week in Colombo". Archived from the original on 26 January 2004.
- International Federation of Netball Associations (21 January 2011a). "Current World Rankings". Archived from the original on 19 May 2011.
- International Federation of Netball Associations (2011) [15 June 2008]. "History of Netball". Archived from the original on 6 March 2011.
- Netball Singapore (2011b). "Milestones". Archived from the original on 18 February 2011.
- Rahim, Samsudin A. (2001). "Development, Media and Youth Issues in Malaysia". In Huskin, Frans Husken; van der Meij, Dick (eds.). Reading Asia: New Research in Asian Studies. Routledge. pp. 29–48. ISBN 0-7007-1371-9.
- Sagar, Naresh (4 July 2010). "Asian Youth Netball Championship". Sagar Media. Archived from the original on 15 July 2011.
