= Nimal Lucas =

Sri Lankan table tennis player

Personal information
- Nationality: Sri Lankan

Sport
- Sport: Table tennis

Dr Nimal Lucas is a veteran table tennis player from Sri Lanka. He also won the national table tennis championship. Additionally, he was the captain of the Sri Lankan table tennis team from 1966 to 1971. He participated in the Men's Open Single events for 65+ and 70 years of age categories, and won several medals. In 2017, he won two silver and two bronze medals at the New Zealand Masters Games held in Whanganui. He played in his first ever international match in 2004. In 2016, he had a total of about 50 medals in his international career.

== See also ==
- List of Sri Lankans by sport
