= Nauchalee Rajapakse =

Sri Lankan netball player

Personal information
- Born: 17 November 1988 (age 37) Galle, Sri Lanka
- Height: 1.70 m (5 ft 7 in)
- Spouse: Aravinda Samaranayaka
- School: Sacred Heart Convent, Galle
- University: University of South Wales, Sabaragamuwa University of Sri Lanka

Netball career
- Playing positions: Goal Defense, Wing Defense

Nauchalee Rajapakse (born 17 November 1988) is a Sri Lankan netball player who represents Sri Lankan netball team in international netball tournaments. She represents Army SC in local netball competitions.

She was a member of the Sri Lankan contingent which emerged as champions at the 2018 Asian Netball Championships for the record fifth time. She also represented Sri Lanka at the 2019 Netball World Cup where the team finished at 19th position.
