= Holy Family Convent, Kurunegala =

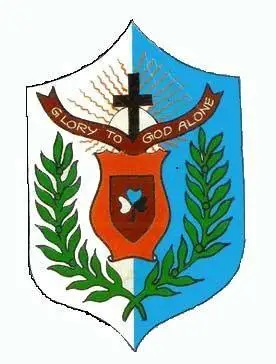
- Holy Family Convent, Kurunegala Holy Family Convent, Kurunegala
- Kurunegala; Sri Lanka

Information
- Type: National
- Motto: Glory To God Alone
- Religious affiliation: Roman Catholic
- Established: 8 September 1870; 155 years ago
- School district: Kurunegala
- Principal: Priyangani Perera
- Grades: 1 to 13
- Enrollment: 3000+
- Campus type: Catholic convent
- Colors: Blue and White
- Alumni: Familians

Holy Family Convent, Kurunegala is a Roman Catholic girls school in Kurunegala, Sri Lanka administered by the Sisters of the Holy Family. It was established in 1870 and falls under the Roman Catholic Diocese of Kurunegala. It provides primary and secondary education.

== History ==
Mother Xavier of Holy Family Convent Jaffna sent six sisters to establish a convent of the Holy Family at Kurunegala on 29 August 1870. The parish priest and parishioners welcomed them warmly when the six Irish sisters arrived at Kurunegala on 8 September 1870. The sisters established the Holy Family Convent in Kurunegala. They were assisted at Benediction in the parish church, and they had their first meal in the Mission House.

Mother M. Josephine Bastide took charge of the new community in November 1870. The first building of the school was located where the Kurunegala Post Office stands today. Classes began in this building. Sisters lived in two houses, one was then known as Daniel’s House. By 1871, classes in both English and Sinhala medium were begun. The total number of students was 42. When visited by the school inspectors, they promised to get the school approved, because there were more than 40 students. The subjects taught were, music, painting, needlework, English, and French.

In 1872, Archbishop Bonjean paid his first visit to the new community. In June of the same year, the Director of Education visited the school, and a government school with its furniture was handed over to the sisters. A piece of land was bought (where the present school stands). Plans were made immediately to work for the new school. By December 1873, sisters went to the new Convent building and in the 1870s the new borders were received.

In June 1876, the Grotto of Our Lady of Lourdes statue was presented by Rev. Fr. Duffo O.M.I. and it was inaugurated in the school premises. The statue of the sacred heart arrived from France.

The Sinhala School was built in 1882. In 1886 orphans were given a more spacious residence. Boys up to age 10 were also allowed to come to the sisters’ school. In 1988 June, there were 116 children in the mixed Sinhalese school. The work done was satisfactory.

== Past Principals ==
1870–1880 – Mother M. Josephine 10 years

1880–1886 – Sr. M. Stanislaus 6 years

1886–1903 – Mother M. Ambrose 7 years

1903–1911 – Sr. M. Carmel 8 years

1911–1931 – Sr. M. Brenda 21 years

1931–1937 – Mother Aquinas Flynn 7 years

1937–1965 – Mother Aquinas O’Neil 28 years

1965–1976 – Sr. M. Raphael de Silva 11 years. Served in school from 1959

1977–1988 – Sr. Yves Marie Cadados 11 years

1988–1996 – Sr. Ida Perera 8 years

1996–2003 – Sr. Henrieta Perera 7 years

2003 - 2013 – Sr. Sriyani Rodrigo 10 years

2013 - 2020 - Sr. Tricilda Fernando 7 years

2020 onwards - Sr. Priyangani Perera

== Notable alumni ==
This is a list of notable alumni from Holy Family Convent, Kurunegala.

Name	Notability	Reference
Gothamie Weerakoon	Sri Lankan based botanist, lichenologist and environmentalist.	
Dulangi Wannithilake	Sri Lankan netball player.	
Vasantha Amarasekara	General practice attorneys in Sri Lanka.	
