= Asia Netball =

Governing body of netball in Asia

- Founded: 1986
- Region: Asia
- President: Datin Seri Narumon Siriwat
- www.asianetball.org

Asia Netball, formerly the Asian Netball Federation, Asian Federation of Netball Associations (AFNA) and Netball Asia, is the governing body of netball in Asia that organize Asian Netball Championships. Netball Asia was founded in 1986 in Kuala Lumpur, Malaysia, three years after representatives from five Asian netball countries – Hong Kong, Malaysia, Singapore, Sri Lanka and India – met during the 1983 Netball World Championships in Singapore to discuss the creation of an Asian netball governing body. The current president of the AFNA is Anna Wong. The Asian Region covers a total of 49 countries. The Asian Region currently has 8 Associate Members and 10 Full Regional & INF Members.

== Events ==
Asian Youth Netball Championship

Asian Netball Championship

== Members ==
Full Members

Team	Association
Australia	Netball Australia
Bangladesh	
Brunei	
Chinese Taipei	
Hong Kong	Hong Kong Netball Association
India	Netball Federation of India
Japan	
Malaysia	Malaysian Netball Association
Maldives	Netball Association of the Maldives
Nepal	
Pakistan	Pakistan Netball Federation
Philippines	Netball Philippines
Saudi Arabia	
Singapore	Netball Singapore
South Korea	
Sri Lanka	Netball Federation of Sri Lanka
Thailand	
Timor-Leste	

Associate Members

Team	Association
Bahrain	
Macau	

Other netball nations

Team	Association
Afghanistan	
Iraq	
Iran	
Indonesia	
Mongolia	
Myanmar	
United Arab Emirates	UAE Netball Federation
Vietnam	
