= Wasantha Soysa =

Sri Lankan karateka

- Born: Alexander Wasantha Wikrama de Soysa; Anuradhapura, Sri Lanka
- Died: 24 October 2015; Anuradhapura, Sri Lanka
- Style: Karate

Wasantha Soysa was a Karate champion and a Guinness record holder who has approximately twelve world records, including breaking twelve slabs of concrete in one blow with his head, and breaking 522 clay tiles. His nickname was the 'Rajarata Iron Man'.

Soysa was born in Sri Lanka and later became the owner of a night club in Anuradhapura. On 24 October 2015, he was murdered at his own night club by an underworld gang.

== Early life ==
Soysa was born in Anuradhapura as Alexander Wasantha Wikrama de Soysa. His father, Alfred de Soysa, was a businessman who was executed in 1972 after being found guilty in the notorious Kelettewa murder case in 1960s.

Soysa completed his education at St. Joseph's College and began to learn martial arts in 1974 under renowned karate instructor D.A. Welgama.

After becoming a successful figure in his field, Soysa made his first Guinness record in 1998 by breaking 525 tiles against his body. On 23 August 2009 he broke a Guinness world record by breaking 12 concrete blocks in one blow with his head, the previous record having been held by a Norwegian national, Narve Laeret, who had broken 7 concrete blocks in 2008.

== Death ==
On 24 October 2015, Wasantha Soysa and three other employees were attacked at Soysa's own night club in Kadapanaha area, Anuradhapura by a group of about 25 individuals. He was admitted to hospital with serious injuries, but died the same day. He was 57 years old.
