= India national netball team =

India
- Association: Netball Federation of India
- Confederation: Asia Netball (Asia)
- World ranking: 25
Team colours

Commonwealth Games
- Appearances: 1 (Debuted in 2010)
- 2010 placing: 12th

India national netball team
Medal record

South Asian Beach Games
| Silver medal – second place | 2011 Sri Lanka | |

The India national netball team is the national netball team of India. The team competed at the 2010 Commonwealth Games in Delhi, for the first time. As of 27 January 2013, India were 29th in the IFNA World Rankings.

== History ==
At the 2010 Commonwealth Games India was coached by Panchali Take and Amit Sharma. Prachi Tehlan captained the team which finished 12th.

== Tournament record ==
=== Asian Netball Championships ===
- 1985 – 5th
- 1989 – 4th
- 1993 – 5th
- 1997 – 4th
- 2001 – 6th
- 2005 – 7th
- 2009 – 7th
- 2012 – 5th
- 2014 – 6th
- 2016 – Did not participate
- 2018 – 8th
- 2022 – 8th
- 2024 – 9th
- 2026 – 6th

=== Commonwealth Games ===
- 2010 – 12th

=== South Asian Beach Games ===
- 2011 – (silver) Silver medal

== Past squads ==
=== 2010 ===
The squad for the 2010 Commonwealth Games

- Prachi Tehlan (captain)
- Neha Bajaj
- Megha Chaudhury
- Priya Dahiya
- Leela Hesaraghat
- Neha Kansal
- Harminder Kaur
- Kiranjeet Kaur
- Ramandeep Kaur
- Rupinder Kaur
- Shireen Limaye
- Manisha Rathore

=== 2018 ===
The squad for the 2018 Asian Netball Championships

- Pallavi Kumari
- Kirti Mor (captain)
- Megha Chaudhary
- Ruchi
- Pooja Chopra
- Gurpreet Kaur
- Ranjitha Badenahalli Jagadeesh (vice-captain)
- Nandini Laxmisagar Gopalakrishnappa
- Aanchal Chauhan
- Ayushi Sharma
- Rajita
- Jyoti Sharma
- Nidhi Sharma

=== 2022 ===
The squad for the 2022 Asian Netball Championships

- Sonam (captain)
- Meghana B.C. (vice captain)
- Kirti
- Ruchi
- Kushi Kumar
- Jaswinder Kaur
- Aishwarya
- Suhani Takker
- Surya Sangwan
- Sunaina
- Manisha
- Vibha Kumari
- Head coach: Suman Kaushik
- Assistant coach: Vivek Kumar Sain
- Team manager : B. Vikramadhitya Reddy

== Notable players ==
- Priyanka Shah
- Prachi Tehlan

== See also ==
- Netball in India
