= Malaysia national netball team =

National netball team

Malaysia
- Association: Malaysian Netball Association
- Confederation: AFNA (Asia)
- Head coach: Tracey Robinson
- Captain: Nur Syafazliyana Binti Mohd Ali
- World ranking: 25 ▲
Blue uniform	Black uniform

Netball World Cup
- Appearances: 7th (Debuted in 1983)
- 2015 placing: 16th
- Best result: 12th (1983)

Commonwealth Games
- Appearances: 1 (Debuted in 1998)
- 1998 placing: 8th

The Malaysia national netball team represents Malaysia in international netball competition at the quadrennial World Netball Championships for the INF Netball World Cup. Malaysia lost the title at the 2005 Asian Netball Championships to Singapore, 53–39. Malaysia qualified for the 2011 World Netball Championships in Singapore, finishing 16th. The team was coached by Choo Kon Lee. As of 2 December 2019, Malaysia is world ranked at 25th. Following the appointment of Australia's Tracey Robinson as head coach in 2016 the team were the 2018 Asian Netball Championships, defeating Sri Lanka. Another title followed at the 2017 Southeast Asian Games captained by Nur Syafazliyana against Singapore. They defended their title at the 2019 Southeast Asian Games, beating Singapore 48-42.

== Team ==
=== 2019 SEA Squad ===
Malaysia national netball team
Players	Coaching staff
Karishma S. Loganathan; Norashikin Kamal Zaman; Pow Mei Foong; Firra Syuhada; Noor Azilah; An Najwa Azizan; Siti Nor Farhana Mustafa; Izyan Syazana Mohd Wazir; Nur Fariha Abdul Razak; Nur Syafazliyana Mohd Ali (C); Noramirah Dayana Noor Azhar; Khairunnisa	Head coach: Tracey Robinson

Asst Coach Aminah Ashaari Manager Zaiton Abdul Ghani

=== 2011 World Netball Championships ===
Twelve players were selected for the 2011 World Netball Championships, held from 3–10 July.

Malaysia national netball team
Players	Coaching staff
Aruna Santhappan (c); Nur Ezzaini Mohd Nor; Norashikin Kamal Zaman; Izyan Syazana Mohd Wazir; Nurul Adha Abu Bakar; Siti Nor Farhana Mustafa; Noramirah Dayana Noor Azhar; Nur Syafazliyana Mohd Ali; Nurul Shaffa Mustafa; Nur Shamilia Mohd Samsudin; Nur Salfarina Mohd Amin; Noor Atika Mohd Radzi	Head coach: Choo Kon Lee; Manager: Datin Seri Shamsiah M. Yasin

== Competitive history ==
Netball World Cup
Year	Championship	Location	Placing
1983	1983 World Netball Tournament	Singapore	12th
1987	1987 World Netball Tournament	Glasgow, Scotland	17th
1991	8th World Championships	Sydney	19th
1995	9th World Championships	Birmingham, England	26th
1999	10th World Championships	Christchurch, New Zealand	19th
2007	12th World Championships	Auckland, New Zealand	16th
2011	13th World Championships	Singapore	16th

Asian Netball Championship
Year	Cup	Location	Placing
1985	1st Asian Championships	Kuala Lumpur, Malaysia	Champions
1989	2nd Asian Championships	New Delhi, India	3rd place
1993	3rd Asian Championships	Hong Kong	4th
1997	4th Asian Championships	Singapore	2nd place
2001	5th Asian Championships	Colombo, Sri Lanka	3rd place
2005	6th Asian Championships	Singapore	2nd place
2009	7th Asian Championships	Kuala Lumpur, Malaysia	3rd place
2012	8th Asian Championships	Colombo, Sri Lanka	3rd place
2014	9th Asian Championships	Singapore	3rd place
2016	10th Asian Championships	Bangkok, Thailand	Champions
2018	11th Asian Championships	Singapore	3rd place
2022	12th Asian Championships	Singapore	3rd place
2024	13th Asian Championships	Bengaluru, India	3rd place

Netball at the Commonwealth Games
Year	Games	Event	Location	Placing
1998	XVI Games	1st Netball	Kuala Lumpur, Malaysia	8th
2002	XVII Games	2nd Netball	Manchester, England	DNP
2006	XVIII Games	3rd Netball	Melbourne, Australia	DNP
2010	XIV Games	4th Netball	Delhi, India	DNP
2014	XX Games	5th Netball	Glasgow, Scotland	DNP

Netball at the Southeast Asian Games
Year	Games	Location	Placing
2001	2001 Southeast Asian Games	Kuala Lumpur, Malaysia	1st
2015	2015 Southeast Asian Games	Singapore	2nd
2017	2017 Southeast Asian Games	Kuala Lumpur	1st
2019	2019 Southeast Asian Games	Laguna, Philippines	1st

Arafura Games
Year	Games	Location	Placing
2007	2007 Arafura Games	Darwin, Northern Territory	4th

== See also ==
- Netball in Malaysia
