= 2009 Asian Netball Championships =

Tournament details
- Host country: Malaysia
- Dates: 19–28 June 2009
- Teams: 9

Final positions
- Champions: Sri Lanka (4th title)
- Runner-up: Singapore
- Third place: Malaysia

The 2009 Asian Netball Championship was the seventh edition of the Asian Netball Championship, a quadrennial Asian netball championship co-ordinated by the Asian Federation of Netball Associations (AIFNA), inaugurated in 1985. Nine nations competed in the tournament with the Sri Lanka taking out their fourth Asian Championship over Singapore.

== Preliminary round ==
=== Group A ===
Pos	Team	Pld	W	D	L	GF	GA	GD	Pts
1	Singapore	3	3	0	0	199	75	124	6
2	Thailand	3	2	0	1	123	122	1	4
3	Chinese Taipei	3	1	0	2	112	146	−34	2
4	Maldives	3	0	0	3	76	165	−89	0

20 June; 14:00	Singapore	55–34	Chinese Taipei

20 June; 18:00	Thailand	49–18	Maldives

21 June; 16:00	Singapore	67–19	Maldives

21 June; 20:00	Chinese Taipei	39–52	Thailand

22 June; 16:00	Singapore	65–22	Thailand

22 June; 20:00	Maldives	39–49	Chinese Taipei

=== Group B ===
Pos	Team	Pld	W	D	L	GF	GA	GD	Pts
1	Sri Lanka	4	4	0	0	357	118	239	8
2	Malaysia	4	3	0	1	271	119	158	6
3	Hong Kong	4	2	0	2	182	177	5	4
4	India	4	1	0	3	128	258	−120	2
5	Pakistan	4	0	0	4	52	320	−268	0

19 June; 16:00	Malaysia	78–15	India

20 June; 16:00	Sri Lanka	80–27	Hong Kong

21 June; 14:00	Pakistan	12–76	Hong Kong

21 June; 18:00	Malaysia	52–72	Sri Lanka

22 June; 14:00	India	22–65	Sri Lanka

22 June; 18:00	Pakistan	6–89	Malaysia

23 June; 14:00	Hong Kong	26–52	Malaysia

23 June; 16:00	India	53–24	Pakistan

24 June; 14:00	Sri Lanka	102–12	Pakistan

24 June; 16:00	Hong Kong	53–33	India

== Classification matches ==
=== 5th-8th place Semi-finals ===
27 June	Chinese Taipei	40–33	India

27 June	Hong Kong	50–22	Maldives

=== 7th place match ===
28 June	India	33–31	Maldives

=== 5th place match ===
28 June	Chinese Taipei	37–43	Hong Kong

== Knockout stage ==
Semi-finals
27 June
Singapore	51
Malaysia	39
27 June
Sri Lanka	88
Thailand	44

Final
28 June
Sri Lanka	77
Singapore	48
Bronze medal match
28 June
Malaysia	61
Thailand	41

== Final standings ==
Place	Nation
Gold	Sri Lanka
Silver	Singapore
Bronze	Malaysia
4	Thailand
5	Hong Kong
6	Chinese Taipei
7	India
8	Maldives
9	Pakistan
