= Ana Cagi Moi =

Fijian netball player

Ana Cagi Moi (born 1998) is a New Zealand based Fijian netball player who plays centre and wing defence. She represented Fiji at the 2017 Netball World Youth Cup in Gaborone, Botswana and the 2023 Netball World Cup in Cape Town, South Africa.

== Early life and education ==
Moi is from Vanualevu in Fiji's Cakaudrove Province. She grew up in Auckland, New Zealand and attended Mount Albert Grammar School. As of October 2023, she was attending Massey University. In 2023, she was one of 151 students who received the university's Blues Award, which recognizes students who excel in academics and athletics.

== Career ==
In 2017, Moi was selected for Fiji's under-21 netball team and played at the Netball World Youth Cup, placing fourth. She was added to the Fiji Pearls extended squad in August of that year.

In 2019, Moi was selected to represent Fiji at the 2019 Netball World Cup in Liverpool, England; the team came in 14th overall.

In April 2023, she was selected to represent Fiji for the Pacific Aus Sports Series in Gold Coast, Australia. She was later selected in the team for the 2023 Netball World Cup in South Africa.
