= Citizens Development Business Finance =

Sri Lankan finance company

Citizens Development Business Finance PLC
- Company type: Public
- Traded as: CSE: CDB.N0000
- ISIN: LK0368N00007
- Industry: Financial services
- Founded: September 7, 1995; 30 years ago
- Headquarters: Colombo, Sri Lanka
- Key people: Alastair Corera (Chairman); Mahesh Nanayakkara (Managing Director/Chief Executive Officer)
- Revenue: ▲LKR17,572 million (2021/22)
- Operating income: ▲LKR5,268 million (2021/22)
- Net income: ▲LKR3,612 million (2021/22)
- AUM: ▲LKR52,217 million
- Total assets: ▲LKR105,420 million (2021/22)
- Total equity: ▲LKR17,648 (2021/22)
- Owner: Ceylinco Life Insurance Ltd (32.13%); Janashakthi Insurance (10.12%); Asia Management Consultancy (Pvt) Ltd (5.28%)
- Website: www.cdb.lk

Citizens Development Business Finance PLC also abbreviated as CDB PLC or CDBF PLC is a Sri Lankan listed public limited company which works as a licensed finance company accepting deposits from general public. It is one of the leading finance companies in Sri Lanka and it is also ranked within the top five largest licensed financial institutions among the 46 non banking institutions in the country. In September 2019, the company received the Best Social Media Initiative of the Year at the 2019 Asian Banking & Finance Awards which was held at the Shangri-La Hotel Singapore. The company was also awarded the Sri Lankan Best Employer Brand of the Year in 2019.

== Cooperate history ==
The Citizens Development Business Finance was incorporated as a public limited company on 7 September 1995 and it is listed at the Colombo Stock Exchange. The company is licensed by the Monetary Board of the Central Bank of Sri Lanka under the Finance Business Act no 42 of 2011. As of 2019, the company has about 71 branches across the country.
