= 2022 Asian Netball Championships =

Tournament details
- Host country: Singapore
- Dates: 3–11 September 2022
- Teams: 11

Final positions
- Champions: Sri Lanka (6th title)
- Runners-up: Singapore
- Third place: Malaysia

Tournament statistics
- Matches played: 35

The 2022 Asian Netball Championships were held in Singapore between 3 September and 11 September 2022, with eleven teams taking part. The championships also served as qualifiers for the 2023 Netball World Cup, as well as the now-cancelled 2021 Asian Indoor and Martial Arts Games.

The tournament had two group stages, with results from the first stage determining groups for the second. After the second round, teams were paired off within their group. For teams in the middle and lower groups of the second round, these play-offs determined final ranking. The two play-offs in the upper group were the tournament's semifinals, with the winners playing each other for the championship and the losers playing for third place.

== Preliminary round ==
=== Group A ===
Team	Pld	W	D	L	GF	GA	GD	Pts
Sri Lanka	2	2	0	0	201	51	+150	4
Philippines	2	1	0	1	82	140	-58	2
India	2	0	0	2	59	147	-92	0

3 September 2022	Sri Lanka	102 – 14	India

4 September 2022	India	41 – 45	Philippines

5 September 2022	Philippines	37 – 99	Sri Lanka

=== Group B ===
Team	Pld	W	D	L	GF	GA	GD	Pts
Singapore	2	2	0	0	199	13	+196	4
Maldives	2	1	0	1	66	117	-51	2
Japan	2	0	0	2	24	159	-135	0

3 September 2022	Singapore	103 – 3	Japan

4 September 2022	Maldives	10 – 96	Singapore

5 September 2022	Japan	21 – 56	Maldives

=== Group C ===
Team	Pld	W	D	L	GF	GA	GD	Pts
Malaysia	2	2	0	0	160	47	+113	4
Brunei	2	1	0	1	60	112	-52	2
Chinese Taipei	2	0	0	2	59	120	-61	0

3 September 2022	Brunei	22 – 78	Malaysia

4 September 2022	Chinese Taipei	34 – 38	Brunei

5 September 2022	Malaysia	82 – 25	Chinese Taipei

=== Group D ===
Team	Pld	W	D	L	GF	GA	GD	Pts
Hong Kong	1	1	0	0	56	29	27	2
Thailand	1	0	0	1	29	56	-27	0

4 September 2022	Thailand	29 – 56	Hong Kong

== Second round ==
=== Group E ===
Team	Pld	W	D	L	GF	GA	GD	Pts
Sri Lanka	3	3	0	0	184	153	+31	6
Singapore	3	2	0	1	161	156	+5	4
Malaysia	3	1	0	2	151	157	-6	2
Hong Kong	3	0	0	3	143	173	-30	0

6 September 2022	Malaysia	53 – 55	Sri Lanka

6 September 2022	Singapore	56 – 46	Hong Kong

7 September 2022	Malaysia	55 – 46	Hong Kong

7 September 2022	Sri Lanka	67 – 49	Singapore

8 September 2022	Sri Lanka	62 – 51	Hong Kong

8 September 2022	Singapore	56 – 43	Malaysia

=== Group F ===
Team	Pld	W	D	L	GF	GA	GD	Pts
Philippines	2	2	0	0	99	78	+21	4
Brunei	2	1	0	1	87	80	+7	2
Maldives	2	0	0	2	81	109	-28	0
Thailand	Withdrawn (Note: Thailand forfeited the game against Brunei due to medical cases among its delegation and subsequently withdrew from the tournament.)							

6 September 2022	Philippines	59 – 41	Maldives

6 September 2022	Brunei	Cancelled	Thailand

7 September 2022	Maldives	Cancelled	Thailand

7 September 2022	Brunei	37 – 40	Philippines

8 September 2022	Maldives	40 – 50	Brunei

8 September 2022	Philippines	Cancelled	Thailand

=== Group G ===
Team	Pld	W	D	L	GF	GA	GD	Pts
India	2	2	0	0	126	57	+69	4
Chinese Taipei	2	1	0	1	139	63	+76	2
Japan	2	0	0	2	30	175	-145	0

6 September 2022	India	79 – 14	Japan

7 September 2022	Chinese Taipei	43 – 47	India

8 September 2022	Japan	16 – 96	Chinese Taipei

== Playoffs ==
=== 5th-10th place ===
10 September 2022	Philippines	42 – 38	Brunei

10 September 2022	India	47 – 33	Chinese Taipei

11 September 2022	Chinese Taipei	71 – 27	Japan

11 September 2022	Brunei	51 – 42	Maldives

=== Semi-finals ===
10 September 2022	Sri Lanka	67 – 43	Hong Kong

10 September 2022	Singapore	54 – 41	Malaysia

=== 3rd/4th place ===
11 September 2022	Hong Kong	42 – 54	Malaysia

=== Final ===
11 September 2022	Sri Lanka	63 – 53	Singapore

== Final placings ==
Place	Country
Gold	Sri Lanka
Silver	Singapore
Bronze	Malaysia
4	Hong Kong
5	Philippines
6	Brunei
7	Maldives
8	India
9	Chinese Taipei
10	Japan

== Broadcasters ==
Country/ Region	Broadcaster	Ref(s)
Brunei; Hong Kong; India; Japan; Maldives; Philippines; Singapore; Sri Lanka; Taiwan; Thailand	Netball Singapore Facebook Page	
Malaysia	Astro	
Outside Asia	Netball Pass	
