= 2011 World Netball Championships =

Tournament details
- Host country: Singapore
- Dates: 3–10 July 2011
- Teams: 16

Final positions
- Champions: Australia (10th title)
- Runners-up: New Zealand
- Third place: England

The 2011 World Netball Championships (Malay: Kejohanan Bola Jaring Sedunia 2011) was the 13th edition of the INF Netball World Cup, a quadrennial premier event in international netball. It was held in Singapore from 3–10 July. All 48 matches were played at the Singapore Indoor Stadium. Singapore was chosen as the host nation at the 2007 IFNA Congress in Auckland.

Sixteen nations contested the week-long tournament. Ten nations gained selection for the World Championships in five regional qualifying tournaments held from 2010 to 2011; the top five national teams from the 2007 tournament also qualified, along with host nation Singapore. The teams were divided into four pools, in which teams played every other team once. The two highest teams in each pool progressed to the quarter-finals, while the remaining teams played in classification matches to determine the 9th–16th placings.

Among the eight nations to qualify for the quarter-finals, Northern Ireland debuted entering in the finals stages. New Zealand advanced to the gold medal playoff by defeating South Africa and England, while Australia joined their Antipodean rivals after victories over Malawi and Jamaica. Medal matches were played on 10 July. England and Jamaica contested the bronze medal match, which England won 70–49. A closely fought gold medal match between Australia and New Zealand was tied at the end of four-quarters of regular time. Australia defended its 2007 title scoring the winning goal in the dying seconds of extra time, defeating New Zealand 58–57 to claim their tenth title.

== Organisation ==
Singapore Indoor Stadium
Host venue
1°18′2.5″N 103°52′27.2″E
Location	Kallang, Singapore
Constructed	1989
Capacity	8,000

=== Bids ===
Bidding to host the 13th World Championships began in 2006. The final vote for hosting the 2011 tournament was held at the 2007 IFNA Congress in Auckland, New Zealand. Delegates at the Congress chose between Singapore and Melbourne, Australia. In a unanimous decision, Singapore was selected to host the 2011 event. The successful Singapore delegation included team co-captains Pearline Chan and Jean Ng. The 2011 tournament was the second time that Singapore has hosted a World Championship, the first being in 1983.

=== Host venue ===
All 48 matches were held at the Singapore Indoor Stadium, located 4 km from the city centre along the Kallang waterfront. The venue was built in 1989 at a cost of S$90 million. It was designed by Japanese architect Kenzo Tange and features an iconic cone-shaped roof. Recently, it has hosted events for the 2009 Asian Youth Games and the 2010 Summer Youth Olympics. It is also set to be part of the new Singapore Sports Hub, which will be built on the site of the nearby Singapore National Stadium.

For the World Netball Championships, the venue contained two adjacent playing courts and an overall seating capacity of 8,000. Singapore has an average temperature of 31 °C in July; however, the venue was kept air-conditioned at a constant temperature of 20 °C throughout the tournament.

=== Sponsors and partners ===
The 2011 World Championships was administered by the International Federation of Netball Associations and Netball Singapore. Mission Foods were the title sponsors for the event, which became known as the 2011 Mission Foods World Netball Championship. Swissôtel The Stamford and Fairmont Singapore are the official hotels for the Championship, where all teams stayed for the duration of the tournament.

=== Broadcasters ===
Country	Broadcaster
Australia	Network Ten (One); ABC Radio
Fiji	Fiji Television
Ireland	BSKYB
Jamaica	Television Jamaica
Malawi	SuperSport
New Zealand	Sky Network Television; Prime
Singapore	ESPN Star Sports (host broadcaster); MediaCorp Channel 5
South Africa	SuperSport
United Kingdom	BSKYB
United States	ESPN3
Region	Broadcaster
Caribbean	Caribbean Media Corporation
Pacific Islands	Fiji Television
Southeast Asia	ESPN Star Sports
Sub-Saharan Africa	SuperSport

== Umpires ==
The IFNA announced on 24 March 2011 that seventeen umpires from seven countries would officiate matches at the tournament, with two more umpires later added.

Nation	Umpire
AUS	Rachael Ayre
AUS	Paula Ferguson
AUS	Sharon Kelly
AUS	Clare McCabe
AUS	Kate Wright
BAR	Marion Johnson-Hurley
ENG	Gary Burgess
ENG	Judith Groves
ENG	Louise Travis
JAM	Dalton Hinds
NZL	Liz Boon
NZL	Jono Bredin
NZL	Bobbi Brown
NZL	Bronwyn Meek
NZL	Fay Meiklejohn
NZL	Mandy Nottingham
RSA	Annie Kloppers
RSA	Theresa Prince
TRI	Joel Young Strong

== Teams ==
=== Qualification ===
Sixteen nations contested the 2011 tournament.

Singapore automatically qualified as the host nation:

- Singapore

The top five teams from the 2007 tournament also qualified:

- Australia
- New Zealand
- Jamaica
- England
- Malawi

The remaining ten teams qualified through five regional tournaments, from each of which two teams progressed to the World Championships.

Africa

- South Africa
- Botswana

Americas

- Trinidad and Tobago
- Barbados

Asia

- Sri Lanka
- Malaysia

Europe

- Northern Ireland
- Wales

Oceania

- Fiji
- Samoa

=== Draw ===
The draw for the 2011 tournament was determined on 12 December 2010 in Singapore.

1. The top 4 teams from the previous championship (Australia, New Zealand, Jamaica and England) were put in the number one position from pool A to pool D respectively.
2. Malawi was then put in the second position in pool D, while hosts Singapore were put in the second position on pool C.
3. Then the five teams who finished first in their qualifying tournaments (Fiji, South Africa, Sri Lanka, Trinidad, Tobago and Northern Ireland) were put into the groups in either the second or third position.
4. Finally, the teams who finished second in their qualifying tournaments (Barbados, Botswana, Malaysia, Samoa and Wales) were put into the groups in either the third or fourth position.

No more than two teams from the same region could have been drawn into the same group. Teams are listed with their IFNA ranking (as of 17 June 2011) in parentheses.

Pool A	Pool B	Pool C	Pool D
Australia (2); Sri Lanka (18); Northern Ireland (12); Samoa (10)	New Zealand (1); Trinidad and Tobago (8); Fiji (5); Wales (13)	Jamaica (4); Singapore (19); South Africa (6); Botswana (17)	England (3); Malawi (7); Barbados (9); Malaysia (23)

== Format ==
The 2011 tournament comprised 48 matches played over eight days from 3–10 July. The 16 participating teams were initially divided into four pools of four teams. During the preliminary pool stage, teams in each pool played each other once. In every pool match, two points were awarded to a winning team, while no points are given to a losing team.

At the end of the preliminary matches, the two teams with the highest number of points in each pool progressed to the finals, ultimately contesting the 1st–8th final placings. The remaining two teams from each pool entered classification matches, which determined the 9th–16th final placings.

Eight teams contested the finals matches, each playing one quarter-final and one semi-final. The four teams that won their quarter-finals contested the medal matches. Of these four teams, the two semi-final winners advanced to the gold medal match, while the other two teams played for bronze. The medal matches were scheduled for the last day of the tournament, on 10 July.

== Preliminary matches ==
=== Pool A ===
Pos	Team	Pld	W	D	L	GF	GA	GD	Pts
1	Australia	3	3	0	0	253	76	177	6
2	Northern Ireland	3	2	0	1	164	168	−4	4
3	Samoa	3	1	0	2	117	200	−83	2
4	Sri Lanka	3	0	0	3	129	219	−90	0

- Highlighted teams advanced to the quarter-finals. Remaining teams will contest classification matches.

4 July; 13:15 (SST)	Report	Australia	81–23	Samoa	Singapore Indoor Stadium: Court 1 Umpires: B. Brown, D. Hinds; Reserve umpire: F. Meiklejohn
4 July; 13:15 (SST)	Report	Bassett 31/31 (100%); Bell 6/8 (75%); Cox 23/27 (85%); Medhurst 21/25 (84%)		Faasavalu 15/27 (56%); Langi 8/15 (53%)	Singapore Indoor Stadium: Court 1 Umpires: B. Brown, D. Hinds; Reserve umpire: F. Meiklejohn

4 July; 15:30 (SST)	Report	Sri Lanka	56–65	Northern Ireland	Singapore Indoor Stadium: Court 2 Umpires: M. Johnson-Hurley, T. Prince; Reserve umpire: J. Young-Strong
4 July; 15:30 (SST)	Report	Sivalingam 54/55 (98%); Samarasinghe 2/3 (67%)		Lennon 50/61 (82%); McCullough 12/15 (80%); O'Hanlon 3/7 (43%)	Singapore Indoor Stadium: Court 2 Umpires: M. Johnson-Hurley, T. Prince; Reserve umpire: J. Young-Strong

5 July; 13:15 (SST)	Report	Samoa	57–53	Sri Lanka	Singapore Indoor Stadium: Court 2 Umpires: G. Burgess, L. Travis; Reserve umpire: J. Bredin
5 July; 13:15 (SST)	Report	Faasavalu 15/20 (75%); Langi 42/48 (88%)		Samarasingha 3/3 (100%); Sivalingam 50/52 (96%)	Singapore Indoor Stadium: Court 2 Umpires: G. Burgess, L. Travis; Reserve umpire: J. Bredin

5 July; 17:45 (SST)	Report	Australia	75–33	Northern Ireland	Singapore Indoor Stadium: Court 1 Umpires: J. Groves, T. Prince; Reserve umpire: G. Burgess
5 July; 17:45 (SST)	Report	Bassett 31/31 (100%); Bell 16/19 (84%); Cox 12/13 (92%); Medhurst 16/17 (94%)		Bowman 8/14 (57%); Lennon 25/36 (69%)	Singapore Indoor Stadium: Court 1 Umpires: J. Groves, T. Prince; Reserve umpire: G. Burgess

6 July; 11:00 (SST)	Report	Northern Ireland	66–37	Samoa	Singapore Indoor Stadium: Court 1 Umpires: A. Kloppers, S. Kelly; Reserve umpire: M. Johnson-Hurley
6 July; 11:00 (SST)	Report	Bowman 6/8 (75%); Lennon 47/58 (81%); McCullough 13/18 (72%)		Chang 5/6 (83%); Faasavalu 16/18 (89%); Langi 16/22 (73%)	Singapore Indoor Stadium: Court 1 Umpires: A. Kloppers, S. Kelly; Reserve umpire: M. Johnson-Hurley

6 July; 20:00 (SST)	Report	Australia	97–20	Sri Lanka	Singapore Indoor Stadium: Court 1 Umpires: L. Travis, J. Young-Strong; Reserve umpire: T. Prince
6 July; 20:00 (SST)	Report	Bassett 30/30 (100%); Bell 16/21 (76%); Cox 27/33 (82%); Medhurst 24/24 (100%)		Samarasingha 4/9 (44%); Sivalingam 16/17 (94%)	Singapore Indoor Stadium: Court 1 Umpires: L. Travis, J. Young-Strong; Reserve umpire: T. Prince

=== Pool B ===
Pos	Team	Pld	W	D	L	GF	GA	GD	Pts
1	New Zealand	3	3	0	0	246	69	177	6
2	Trinidad and Tobago	3	2	0	1	132	163	−31	4
3	Fiji	3	1	0	2	113	176	−63	2
4	Wales	3	0	0	3	107	190	−83	0

- Highlighted teams advanced to the quarter-finals. Remaining teams will contest classification matches.

4 July; 13:15 (SST)	Report	Trinidad and Tobago	51–48	Wales	Singapore Indoor Stadium: Court 2 Umpires: J. Groves, K. Wright; Reserve umpire: B. Meek
4 July; 13:15 (SST)	Report	Cooper 6/6 (100%); Barker 36/40 (90%); Wilson 9/11 (82%)		James 19/22 (86%); Lewis 13/14 (93%); Moseley 20/28 (71%)	Singapore Indoor Stadium: Court 2 Umpires: J. Groves, K. Wright; Reserve umpire: B. Meek

4 July; 15:30 (SST)	Report	New Zealand	80–25	Fiji	Singapore Indoor Stadium: Court 1 Umpires: R. Ayre, L. Travis; Reserve umpire: S. Kelly
4 July; 15:30 (SST)	Report	Griffin 24/29 (83%); Thompson 24/28 (86%); Tutaia 7/8 (88%) van Dyk 25/26 (96%)		Lutua 1/1 (100%); Rusivakula 11/21 (52%); Vonolagi 13/18 (72%)	Singapore Indoor Stadium: Court 1 Umpires: R. Ayre, L. Travis; Reserve umpire: S. Kelly

5 July; 11:00 (SST)	Report	Fiji	40–58	Trinidad and Tobago	Singapore Indoor Stadium: Court 1
5 July; 11:00 (SST)	Report	Rusivakula 24/32 (75%); Vonolagi 16/21 (76%)		Barker 14/17 (82%); Cooper 13/15 (87%); Wilson 31/34 (91%)	Singapore Indoor Stadium: Court 1

5 July; 13:15 (SST)	Report	New Zealand	91–21	Wales	Singapore Indoor Stadium: Court 1 Umpires: R. Ayre, M. Hurley-Johnson; Reserve umpire: K. Wright
5 July; 13:15 (SST)	Report	Griffin 36/40 (90%); Thompson 9/9 (100%); Tutaia 14/18 (78%) van Dyk 32/33 (97%)		James 5/9 (56%); Lewis 8/19 (42%); Moseley 0/1 (0%); Thomas 8/9 (89%)	Singapore Indoor Stadium: Court 1 Umpires: R. Ayre, M. Hurley-Johnson; Reserve umpire: K. Wright

6 July; 13:15 (SST)	Report	Fiji	48–38	Wales	Singapore Indoor Stadium: Court 1 Umpires: G. Burgess, F. Meiklejohn; Reserve umpire: B. Brown
6 July; 13:15 (SST)	Report	Lutua 14/18 (78%); Rusivakula 32/43 (74%); Vonolagi 2/3 (67%)		James 7/12 (58%); Lewis 13/19 (68%); Moseley 10/14 (71%); Thomas 8/8 (100%)	Singapore Indoor Stadium: Court 1 Umpires: G. Burgess, F. Meiklejohn; Reserve umpire: B. Brown

6 July; 15:30 (SST)	Report	New Zealand	75–23	Trinidad and Tobago	Singapore Indoor Stadium: Court 1 Umpires: J. Groves, D. Hinds; Reserve umpire: A. Kloppers
6 July; 15:30 (SST)	Report	Griffin 22/26 (85%); Thompson 16/17 (94%); Tutaia 18/19 (95%) van Dyk 19/20 (95%)		Barker 9/10 (90%); Cooper 5/8 (63%); Wilson 7/12 (58%)	Singapore Indoor Stadium: Court 1 Umpires: J. Groves, D. Hinds; Reserve umpire: A. Kloppers

=== Pool C ===
Pos	Team	Pld	W	D	L	GF	GA	GD	Pts
1	Jamaica	3	3	0	0	239	108	131	6
2	South Africa	3	2	0	1	172	143	29	4
3	Botswana	3	1	0	2	104	167	−63	2
4	Singapore	3	0	0	3	109	206	−97	0

- Highlighted teams advanced to the quarter-finals. Remaining teams will contest classification matches.

3 July; 19:00 (SST)	Report	Singapore	36–43	Botswana	Singapore Indoor Stadium: Court 1 Umpires: S. Kelly, B. Meek; Reserve umpire: D. Hinds
3 July; 19:00 (SST)	Report	Li, Tan, Tett 43/56 (77%)		Moabi, Rasekhumba, Radipotsane 36/57 (63%)	Singapore Indoor Stadium: Court 1 Umpires: S. Kelly, B. Meek; Reserve umpire: D. Hinds

4 July; 11:00 (SST)	Report	Jamaica	72–45	South Africa	Singapore Indoor Stadium: Court 1 Umpires: G. Burgess, J. Young-Strong; Reserve umpire: S. Kelly
4 July; 11:00 (SST)	Report	R. Aiken 40/49 (82%); Fowler 21/24 (88%); Griffiths 11/15 (73%)		Basson 23/26 (88%); Bootha 16/22 (73%); Holtzhausen 6/11 (55%)	Singapore Indoor Stadium: Court 1 Umpires: G. Burgess, J. Young-Strong; Reserve umpire: S. Kelly

5 July; 15:30 (SST)	Report	Singapore	33–70	South Africa	Singapore Indoor Stadium: Court 1 Umpires: J. Bredin, K. Wright; Reserve umpire: J. Young-Strong
5 July; 15:30 (SST)	Report	Chen 8/14 (57%); Li 6/11 (55%); Tett 19/27 (70%)		Basson 37/39 (95%); Holtzhausen 28/38 (74%); Mbewe 5/5 (100%)	Singapore Indoor Stadium: Court 1 Umpires: J. Bredin, K. Wright; Reserve umpire: J. Young-Strong

5 July; 15:30 (SST)	Report	Jamaica	74–23	Botswana	Singapore Indoor Stadium: Court 2 Umpires: P. Ferguson, A. Kloppers; Reserve umpire: C. McCabe
5 July; 15:30 (SST)	Report	R. Aiken 29/32 (91%); Fowler 32/35 (91%); Ffrench-Kentish 1/2 (50%); Griffiths 12/12 (100%)		Gabaratane 6/11 (55%); Moabi 11/16 (69%); Radipotsane 3/5 (60%); Rasekhumba 3/7 (43%)	Singapore Indoor Stadium: Court 2 Umpires: P. Ferguson, A. Kloppers; Reserve umpire: C. McCabe

6 July; 17:45 (SST)	Report	Singapore	40–93	Jamaica	Singapore Indoor Stadium: Court 1 Umpires: J. Bredin, B. Brown; Reserve umpire: M. Johnson-Hurley
6 July; 17:45 (SST)	Report	Chen 8/13 (62%); Li 7/9 (78%); Tett 9/12 (75%); Soh 13/17 (76%); Tan 3/5 (60%)		R. Aiken 26/28 (93%); Ffrench-Kentish 9/11 (82%); Fowler 58/62 (94%)	Singapore Indoor Stadium: Court 1 Umpires: J. Bredin, B. Brown; Reserve umpire: M. Johnson-Hurley

6 July; 20:00 (SST)	Report	South Africa	57–38	Botswana	Singapore Indoor Stadium: Court 2 Umpires: P. Ferguson and C. McCabe; Reserve umpire: D. Hinds
6 July; 20:00 (SST)	Report	Basson 30/35 (86%); Bootha 16/20 (80%); Holtzhausen 11/13 (85%)		Moabi 21/22 (95%); Radipotsane 2/2 (100%); Rasekhumba 15/23 (65%)	Singapore Indoor Stadium: Court 2 Umpires: P. Ferguson and C. McCabe; Reserve umpire: D. Hinds

=== Pool D ===
Pos	Team	Pld	W	D	L	GF	GA	GD	Pts
1	England	3	3	0	0	234	97	137	6
2	Malawi	3	2	0	1	172	144	28	4
3	Barbados	3	1	0	2	148	187	−39	2
4	Malaysia	3	0	0	3	97	223	−126	0

- Highlighted teams advanced to the quarter-finals. Remaining teams will contest classification matches.

4 July; 17:45 (SST)	Report	England	65–33	Malawi	Singapore Indoor Stadium: Court 1 Umpires: P. Ferguson, C. McCabe; Reserve umpire: B. Meek
4 July; 17:45 (SST)	Report	Brownfield 21/24 (88%); Cookey 17/20 (85%); Dunn 5/6 (83%); Harten 22/24 (92%)		Chiboko 0/0 (0%); Kumwenda 26/29 (90%); Simtowe 7/11 (64%)	Singapore Indoor Stadium: Court 1 Umpires: P. Ferguson, C. McCabe; Reserve umpire: B. Meek

4 July; 20:00 (SST)	Report	Barbados	62–40	Malaysia	Singapore Indoor Stadium: Court 1 Umpires: J. Bredin, A. Kloppers; Reserve umpire: F. Meiklejohn
4 July; 20:00 (SST)	Report	Bishop 21/22 (95%); L. Browne 25/28 (89%); Piggott 16/20 (80%)		Kamal Zaman 12/14 (86%); Mohd Wazir 23/32 (72%); Santhappan 5/15 (33%)	Singapore Indoor Stadium: Court 1 Umpires: J. Bredin, A. Kloppers; Reserve umpire: F. Meiklejohn

5 July; 20:00 (SST)	Report	England	74–42	Barbados	Singapore Indoor Stadium: Court 1 Umpires: B. Brown, S. Kelly; Reserve umpire: J. Young-Strong
5 July; 20:00 (SST)	Report	Brownfield 17/18 (94%); Cookey 8/9 (89%); Dunn 27/32 (84%); Harten 22/24 (92%)		Bishop 23/33 (70%); L. Browne 0/1 (0%); Piggott 19/21 (90%)	Singapore Indoor Stadium: Court 1 Umpires: B. Brown, S. Kelly; Reserve umpire: J. Young-Strong

5 July; 20:00 (SST)	Report	Malawi	66–35	Malaysia	Singapore Indoor Stadium: Court 2 Umpires: D. Hinds, C. McCabe; Reserve umpire: R. Ayre
5 July; 20:00 (SST)	Report	Chiboko 1/1 (100%); Kumwenda 36/39 (92%); Mvula 10/11 (91%); Simtowe 19/23 (83%)		Kamal Zaman 7/10 (70%); Mohd Nor 3/5 (60%); Mohd Wazir 15/19 (79%); Santhappan 10/14 (71%)	Singapore Indoor Stadium: Court 2 Umpires: D. Hinds, C. McCabe; Reserve umpire: R. Ayre

6 July; 13:15 (SST)	Report	Malawi	73–44	Barbados	Singapore Indoor Stadium: Court 2 Umpires: B. Meek, K. Wright; Reserve umpire: L. Travis
6 July; 13:15 (SST)	Report	Kumwenda 48/54 (89%); Simtowe 15/18 (83%)		Bishop 19/20 (95%); L. Browne 15/20 (75%); Piggott 8/11 (73%)	Singapore Indoor Stadium: Court 2 Umpires: B. Meek, K. Wright; Reserve umpire: L. Travis

6 July; 15:30 (SST)	Report	England	95–22	Malaysia	Singapore Indoor Stadium: Court 2 Umpires: R. Ayre, T. Prince; Reserve umpire: P. Ferguson
6 July; 15:30 (SST)	Report	Brownfield 29/32 (91%); Cookey 9/11 (82%); Dunn 34/39 (87%); Harten 22/24 (92%)		Kamal Zaman 8/11 (73%); Mohd Nor 6/10 (60%); Mohd Wazir 2/2 (100%); Santhappan 6/11 (55%)	Singapore Indoor Stadium: Court 2 Umpires: R. Ayre, T. Prince; Reserve umpire: P. Ferguson

== Classification matches ==
=== Round 1 ===
7 July; 11:00 (SST)	Report	Barbados	63–59	Sri Lanka	Singapore Indoor Stadium: Court 1 Umpires: J. Bredin, T. Prince; Reserve umpire: R. Ayre
7 July; 11:00 (SST)	Report	Bishop 37/44 (84%); Piggott 26/34 (76%)		Sivalingam 59/59 (100%)	Singapore Indoor Stadium: Court 1 Umpires: J. Bredin, T. Prince; Reserve umpire: R. Ayre

7 July; 13:15 (SST)	Report	Fiji	57–47	Singapore	Singapore Indoor Stadium: Court 1 Umpires: L. Travis, J. Young-Strong; Reserve umpire: P. Ferguson
7 July; 13:15 (SST)	Report	Lutua 12/18 (67%); Rusivakula 43/58 (74%); Vonolagi 2/3 (67%)		Li 9/13 (69%); Soh 21/33 (64%); Tan 16/20 (80%); Tett 1/2 (50%)	Singapore Indoor Stadium: Court 1 Umpires: L. Travis, J. Young-Strong; Reserve umpire: P. Ferguson

7 July; 15:30 (SST)	Report	Samoa	54–45	Malaysia	Singapore Indoor Stadium: Court 1 Umpires: F. Meiklejohn, J. Groves; Reserve umpire: G. Burgess
7 July; 15:30 (SST)	Report	Chang 30/35 (86%); Faasavalu 20/20 (100%); Langi 4/5 (80%)		Mohd Wazir 33/43 (77%); Santhappan 12/17 (71%)	Singapore Indoor Stadium: Court 1 Umpires: F. Meiklejohn, J. Groves; Reserve umpire: G. Burgess

7 July; 17:45 (SST)	Report	Botswana	46–47	Wales	Singapore Indoor Stadium: Court 1 Umpires: R. Brown, M. Johnson-Hurley; Reserve umpire: C. McCabe
7 July; 17:45 (SST)	Report	Gabaratane 0/1 (0%); Moabi 38/43 (88%); Rasekhumba 8/13 (62%)		James 31/38 (82%); Lewis 7/11 (64%); Moseley 5/5 (100%); Thomas 4/5 (80%)	Singapore Indoor Stadium: Court 1 Umpires: R. Brown, M. Johnson-Hurley; Reserve umpire: C. McCabe

=== Round 2 ===
8 July; 11:00 (SST)	Report	Sri Lanka	62–51	Singapore	Singapore Indoor Stadium: Court 1 Umpires: J. Groves, M. Johnson-Hurley; Reserve umpire: T. Prince
8 July; 11:00 (SST)	Report	Bollagala 2/2 (100%); Sivalingam 60/61 (98%)		Li 11/16 (69%); Soh 28/33 (85%); Tan 12/15 (80%)	Singapore Indoor Stadium: Court 1 Umpires: J. Groves, M. Johnson-Hurley; Reserve umpire: T. Prince

8 July; 13:15 (SST)	Report	Malaysia	39–60	Botswana	Singapore Indoor Stadium: Court 2 Umpires: F. Meiklejohn, L. Travis; Reserve umpire: B. Meek
8 July; 13:15 (SST)	Report	Kamal Zaman 4/5 (80%); Mohd Nor 3/6 (50%); Mohd Wazir 24/31 (77%); Santhappan 8/13 (62%)		Moeng 3/5 (60%); Radipotsane 37/40 (93%); Rasekhumba 20/22 (91%)	Singapore Indoor Stadium: Court 2 Umpires: F. Meiklejohn, L. Travis; Reserve umpire: B. Meek

8 July; 15:30 (SST)	Report	Barbados	48–49	Fiji	Singapore Indoor Stadium: Court 2 Umpires: P. Ferguson, D. Hinds; Reserve umpire: A. Kloppers
8 July; 15:30 (SST)	Report	Bishop 26/32 (81%); Piggott 22/24 (92%)		Lutua 11/15 (73%); Rusivakula 33/45 (73%); Vonolagi 5/5 (100%)	Singapore Indoor Stadium: Court 2 Umpires: P. Ferguson, D. Hinds; Reserve umpire: A. Kloppers

8 July; 20:00 (SST)	Report	Samoa	44–45	Wales	Singapore Indoor Stadium: Court 2 Umpires: G. Burgess, A. Kloppers; Reserve umpire: K. Wright
8 July; 20:00 (SST)	Report	Chang 21/30 (70%); Faasavalu 23/28 (82%)		James 27/31 (87%); Lewis 8/11 (73%); Moseley 2/4 (50%); Thomas 8/9 (89%)	Singapore Indoor Stadium: Court 2 Umpires: G. Burgess, A. Kloppers; Reserve umpire: K. Wright

=== Playoffs 9–16 ===
9 July; 11:00 (SST)	Report	Samoa	45–68	Barbados	Singapore Indoor Stadium: Court 1 Umpires: J. Groves, J. Young-Strong; Reserve umpire: A. Kloppers
9 July; 11:00 (SST)	Report	Chang 5/6 (83%); Faasavalu 4/7 (57%); Langi 31/34 (91%); To'o 5/6 (83%)		Bishop 3/5 (60%); L. Browne 39/42 (93%); Piggott 26/29 (90%)	Singapore Indoor Stadium: Court 1 Umpires: J. Groves, J. Young-Strong; Reserve umpire: A. Kloppers

9 July; 11:00 (SST)	Report	Malaysia	36–47	Singapore	Singapore Indoor Stadium: Court 2 Umpires: M. Johnson-Hurley, T. Prince; Reserve umpire: J. Bredin
9 July; 11:00 (SST)	Report	Kamal Zaman 26/30 (87%); Mohd Nor 3/3 (100%); Mohd Wazir 2/4 (50%); Noor Azhar 5/7 (71%)		Chen 7/10 (70%); Li 2/4 (50%); Soh 2/4 (50%); Tan 36/42 (86%)	Singapore Indoor Stadium: Court 2 Umpires: M. Johnson-Hurley, T. Prince; Reserve umpire: J. Bredin

9 July; 13:15 (SST)	Report	Wales	62–47	Fiji	Singapore Indoor Stadium: Court 1 Umpires: S. Kelly, F. Meiklejohn; Reserve umpire: C. McCabe
9 July; 13:15 (SST)	Report	James 18/21 (86%); Moseley 44/54 (81%)		Lutua 4/7 (57%); Rusivakula 35/48 (73%); Vonolagi 8/12 (67%)	Singapore Indoor Stadium: Court 1 Umpires: S. Kelly, F. Meiklejohn; Reserve umpire: C. McCabe

9 July; 13:15 (SST)	Report	Botswana	59–54	Sri Lanka	Singapore Indoor Stadium: Court 2 Umpires: G. Burgess, D. Hinds; Reserve umpire: L. Travis
9 July; 13:15 (SST)	Report	Moabi 27/29 (93%); Radipotsane 7/9 (78%); Rasekhumba 25/28 (89%)		Bollagala 0/0 (0%); Shalika 0/0 (0%); Sivalingam 51/52 (98%)	Singapore Indoor Stadium: Court 2 Umpires: G. Burgess, D. Hinds; Reserve umpire: L. Travis

== Finals matches ==
Following the pool play, Australia, Northern Ireland, New Zealand, Trinidad and Tobago, Jamaica, South Africa, England and Malawi advanced to the quarter-finals. England overwhelmed Northern Ireland to meet New Zealand, who beat South Africa, in one semi-final. Australia had a hard-fought victory over Malawi to meet Jamaica, who defeated the other Caribbean contender Trinidad and Tobago, in the other semi. New Zealand (49–34) and Australia (82–46) won their semi-finals leaving England and Jamaica to contest the bronze medal match, which England won 70–49.

The final between the Antipodean rivals was locked at 46 all after the regulation 60 minutes of playing time. New Zealand had dominated the first two quarters to open up a six-goal lead. Australia whittled the lead down and with a minute left New Zealand led by one, just needing to retain possession to win. However, Australia stole the ball and levelled the scores, and would have won had their next shot in the last play been successful. With the scores tied at the end of regulation time, two seven-minute periods of extra time were played. It was still even after the first half of extra time, with Australia eventually winning 58–57 in the dying seconds of extra time to claim their tenth World Championship title.

Quarter-finals
Australia	58
Malawi	44
Jamaica	79
Trinidad and Tobago	42
England	87
Northern Ireland	16
New Zealand	58
South Africa	28

Semi-finals
Australia	82
Jamaica	46
England	34
New Zealand	49

Gold medal match
Australia	58
New Zealand	57
Bronze medal match
England	70
Jamaica	49

=== Quarter-finals ===
8 July; 13:15 (SST)	Report	England	87–16	Northern Ireland	Singapore Indoor Stadium: Court 1 Umpires: J. Bredin, K. Wright; Reserve umpire: B. Brown
8 July; 13:15 (SST)	Report	Brownfield 16/17 (94%); Cookey 26/29 (90%); Harten 45/53 (85%)		Bowman 3/5 (60%); Lennon 10/20 (50%); McCullough 3/9 (33%); O'Hanlon 0/1 (0%)	Singapore Indoor Stadium: Court 1 Umpires: J. Bredin, K. Wright; Reserve umpire: B. Brown

8 July; 15:30 (SST)	Report	New Zealand	58–28	South Africa	Singapore Indoor Stadium: Court 1 Umpires: S. Kelly, C. McCabe; Reserve umpire: J. Groves
8 July; 15:30 (SST)	Report	Griffin 16/22 (73%); Thompson 8/10 (80%); Tutaia 20/29 (69%) van Dyk 14/15 (93%)		Basson 22/28 (79%); Holtzhausen 6/10 (60%)	Singapore Indoor Stadium: Court 1 Umpires: S. Kelly, C. McCabe; Reserve umpire: J. Groves

8 July; 17:45 (SST)	Report	Australia	58–44	Malawi	Singapore Indoor Stadium: Court 1 Umpires: B. Meek, J. Young-Strong; Reserve umpire: J. Bredin
8 July; 17:45 (SST)	Report	Bassett 21/21 (100%); Cox 16/20 (80%); Medhurst 21/24 (88%)		Kumwenda 21/27 (78%); Simtowe 23/30 (77%)	Singapore Indoor Stadium: Court 1 Umpires: B. Meek, J. Young-Strong; Reserve umpire: J. Bredin

8 July; 20:00 (SST)	Report	Jamaica	79–42	Trinidad and Tobago	Singapore Indoor Stadium: Court 1 Umpires: R. Ayre, B. Brown; Reserve umpire: L. Travis
8 July; 20:00 (SST)	Report	R. Aiken 19/22 (86%); Ffrench-Kentish 1/2 (50%); Fowler 42/43 (98%); Griffiths 17/19 (89%)		Barker 7/9 (78%); Cooper 15/20 (75%); Wilson 20/26 (77%)	Singapore Indoor Stadium: Court 1 Umpires: R. Ayre, B. Brown; Reserve umpire: L. Travis

=== Semi-finals ===
9 July; 15:30 (SST)	Report	New Zealand	49–34	England	Singapore Indoor Stadium: Court 1 Umpires: K. Wright, P. Ferguson; Reserve umpire: R. Ayre
9 July; 15:30 (SST)	Report	Tutaia 26/38 (68%) van Dyk 23/25 (92%)		Brownfield 8/14 (57%); Cookey 14/16 (88%); Harten 13/14 (93%)	Singapore Indoor Stadium: Court 1 Umpires: K. Wright, P. Ferguson; Reserve umpire: R. Ayre

9 July; 17:45 (SST)	Report	Australia	82–46	Jamaica	Singapore Indoor Stadium: Court 1 Umpires: B. Meek, B. Brown; Reserve umpire: G. Burgess
9 July; 17:45 (SST)	Report	Bassett 11/11 (100%); Bell 4/4 (100%); Cox 39/47 (83%); Medhurst 28/30 (93%)		R. Aiken 7/9 (78%); Fowler 37/43 (86%); Griffiths 2/2 (100%)	Singapore Indoor Stadium: Court 1 Umpires: B. Meek, B. Brown; Reserve umpire: G. Burgess

=== Semi-finals 5–8 ===
9 July; 20:00 (SST)	Report	Malawi	61–38	Trinidad and Tobago	Singapore Indoor Stadium: Court 1 Umpires: R. Ayre, A. Kloppers; Reserve umpire: L. Travis
9 July; 20:00 (SST)	Report	Kumwenda 40/44 (91%); Mvula 2/3 (67%); Simtowe 19/22 (86%)		Barker 17/20 (85%); Cooper 11/12 (92%); Wilson 11/12 (92%)	Singapore Indoor Stadium: Court 1 Umpires: R. Ayre, A. Kloppers; Reserve umpire: L. Travis

9 July; 20:00 (SST)	Report	South Africa	46–41	Northern Ireland	Singapore Indoor Stadium: Court 2 Umpires: J. Bredin, C. McCabe; Reserve umpire: F. Meiklejohn
9 July; 20:00 (SST)	Report	Basson 30/38 (79%); Du Toit 6/11 (55%); Holtzhausen 5/8 (63%); Mbewe 7/7 (100%)		Bowman 5/10 (50%); Lennon 24/32 (75%); McCullough 9/10 (90%)	Singapore Indoor Stadium: Court 2 Umpires: J. Bredin, C. McCabe; Reserve umpire: F. Meiklejohn

=== 7th place match ===
10 July; 10:00 (SST)	Report	Trinidad and Tobago	56–38	Northern Ireland	Singapore Indoor Stadium: Court 1 Umpires: C. McCabe, K. Wright; Reserve umpire: F. Meiklejohn
10 July; 10:00 (SST)	Report	Barker 5/7 (71%); Cooper 5/7 (71%); Richardson 1/3 (33%); Wilson 45/48 (94%)		Bowman 8/17 (47%); Lennon 21/32 (66%); McCullough 7/14 (50%); O'Hanlon 2/8 (25%)	Singapore Indoor Stadium: Court 1 Umpires: C. McCabe, K. Wright; Reserve umpire: F. Meiklejohn

=== 5th place match ===
10 July; 12:15 (SST)	Report	Malawi	50–52	South Africa	Singapore Indoor Stadium: Court 1 Umpires: P. Ferguson, B. Meek; Reserve umpire: J. Bredin
10 July; 12:15 (SST)	Report	Kumwenda 41/41 (100%); Simtowe 9/10 (90%)		Basson 29/34 (85%); Bootha 22/35 (63%); Holtzhausen 1/1 (100%)	Singapore Indoor Stadium: Court 1 Umpires: P. Ferguson, B. Meek; Reserve umpire: J. Bredin

=== Bronze medal match ===
10 July 2011; 14:30 (SST)	Report	England	70–49	Jamaica	Singapore Indoor Stadium: Court 1 Umpires: R. Ayre, S. Kelly; Reserve umpire: B. Brown
10 July 2011; 14:30 (SST)	Report	Cookey 19/28 (68%); Harten 51/61 (84%)		R. Aiken 23/27 (85%); Fowler 16/22 (73%); Griffiths 10/13 (77%)	Singapore Indoor Stadium: Court 1 Umpires: R. Ayre, S. Kelly; Reserve umpire: B. Brown

=== Gold medal match ===
10 July 2011; 16:45 (SST)	Report	New Zealand	57–58	Australia	Singapore Indoor Stadium: Court 1 Umpires: G. Burgess, D. Hinds; Reserve umpire: A. Kloppers
10 July 2011; 16:45 (SST)	Report	Tutaia 23/33 (70%) van Dyk 34/35 (97%)		Bassett 27/30 (90%); Cox 12/16 (75%); Medhurst 19/23 (83%)	Singapore Indoor Stadium: Court 1 Umpires: G. Burgess, D. Hinds; Reserve umpire: A. Kloppers

== Final standings ==
Place	Nation
Gold	Australia
Silver	New Zealand
Bronze	England
4	Jamaica
5	South Africa
6	Malawi
7	Trinidad and Tobago
8	Northern Ireland
9	Wales
10	Fiji
11	Barbados
12	Samoa
13	Botswana
14	Sri Lanka
15	Singapore
16	Malaysia

=== Medallists ===
Gold	Silver	Bronze
Australia; Coach: Norma Plummer	New Zealand; Coach: Ruth Aitken	England; Coach: Sue Hawkins
Caitlin Bassett; Erin Bell; Julie Corletto; Catherine Cox (vc); Susan Fuhrmann; Laura Geitz; Mo'onia Gerrard; Kimberlee Green; Sharni Layton; Natalie Medhurst; Chelsea Pitman; Natalie von Bertouch (c)	Leana de Bruin; Temepara George (vc); Katrina Grant; Paula Griffin; Joline Henry; Laura Langman; Liana Leota; Anna Scarlett; Anna Thompson; Maria Tutaia; Irene van Dyk; Casey Williams (c)	Karen Atkinson (cc); Eboni Beckford-Chambers; Louisa Brownfield; Jade Clarke; Pamela Cookey; Rachel Dunn; Stacey Francis; Tamsin Greenway; Serena Guthrie; Joanne Harten; Geva Mentor; Sonia Mkoloma (cc)
