= Sri Lanka national netball team =

Sri Lanka
- Nickname(s): The Lionesses
- Association: Netball Federation of Sri Lanka
- Confederation: Netball Asia
- Head coach: Hyacinth Wijesinghe
- Captain: Gayanjali Amarawansa
- World ranking: 23
Primary	Secondary

Netball World Cup
- Appearances: 10 (Debuted in 1963)
- 2023 placing: 16th
- Best result: 9th (1963)

Commonwealth Games
- Appearances: 2 (Debuted in 1998)
- Best result: 10th (2002)

The Sri Lanka national netball team represents Siri Lanka in international netball. As of March 2023, the team was ranked 15th in the world by World Netball.

== History ==
Netball was first played in Sri Lanka in 1921. The first game was played by Ceylon Girl Guide Company at Kandy High School. By 1952, Sri Lankan clubs were playing Indian club sides. In 1956, Sri Lanka played its first international match against Australia's national team in Sri Lanka. In 1963, Sri Lanka was one of eleven teams who participated in the first Netball World Cup. For Ceylon, they would finish in ninth place as they get a win over Wales and Northern Ireland. In 1972, the Netball Federation of Sri Lanka was created. In 1983, Netball Federation of Sri Lanka was dissolved by the government. England's record against Ceylon in international matches between 1949 and 1976 was one win.

Sri Lanka took part in the 1960 Netball Meeting of Commonwealth countries to try to standardise the rules for the game. This meeting took place in Sri Lanka.

Sri Lanka competed in the 7th Asian Youth Netball Championship held in 2010 in India. The Beach Netball Championship 2012 for Men and Women was held at the Beach of Catamaran Beach Hotel, Negombo. Teams from Sri Lanka, India, Pakistan and Maldives participated in this tournament. The Sri Lanka women’s team emerged champions in this section beating the Maldivian team by 19 goals to 10.

== Championships ==
Sri Lanka emerged the Asian region champions in the M1 Asian Netball Championships 2018 after triumphing over host Singapore 69-50 in the final played at OCBC arena, Singapore on 9 September 2018. This is the fifth time Sri Lanka had emerged as the Asian champions, the last championship won being in 2009. The side was captained by Chathurangi Jayasooriya. Tharjini Sivalingam, the 2.08 m goal-shooter, along with three other players in the starting XI standing over 1.8 m, played a major role in defeating the strong Singaporean side. The Malaysian Team, which Sri Lanka beat in the semi-finals emerged in third place.

Following the victory, team captain Chaturangi Jayasooriya attributed their tournament success to an eight-month training regimen, team cohesion, and strict discipline under coach Thilaka Jinadasa.

As the top team in the championship, Sri Lanka has automatically qualified for the 2019 Netball World Cup in Liverpool, England.

== Competitive record ==
Netball World Cup
Year	Championship	Location	Placing
1963	1963 World Netball Tournament	Eastbourne, England	9th
1983	1983 World Netball Tournament	Singapore	14th
1987	1987 World Netball Tournament	Glasgow, Scotland	16th
1991	8th World Championships	Sydney, Australia	15th
1995	9th World Championships	Birmingham, England	19th
1999	10th World Championships	Christchurch, New Zealand	21st
2003	11th World Championships	Kingston, Jamaica	18th
2011	13th World Championships	Singapore	14th
2015	14th World Cup	Sydney, Australia	16th
2019	15th World Cup	Liverpool, England	15th
2023	16th World Cup	Cape Town, South Africa	16th

Asian Netball Championship
Year	Cup	Location	Placing
1985	1st Asian Championships	Kuala Lumpur, Malaysia	Runners-up
1989	2nd Asian Championships	New Delhi, India	Champions
1993	3rd Asian Championships	Hong Kong	3rd place
1997	4th Asian Championships	Singapore	Champions
2001	5th Asian Championships	Colombo, Sri Lanka	Champions
2005	6th Asian Championships	Singapore	3rd place
2009	7th Asian Championships	Kuala Lumpur, Malaysia	Champions
2012	8th Asian Championships	Colombo, Sri Lanka	Runners-up
2014	9th Asian Championships	Singapore	Runners-up
2016	10th Asian Championships	Thailand	Runners-up
2018	11th Asian Championships	Singapore	Champions
2022	12th Asian Championships	Singapore	Champions
2024	13th Asian Championships	Bengaluru, India	Runners-up

Nations Cup
Year	Cup	Location	Placing
2006	4 Nations Cup	Singapore	DNP
2007	5 Nations Cup	Singapore	4th
2008	5 Nations Cup	Singapore	4th
2009	6 Nations Cup	Singapore	DNP
2010	6 Nations Cup	Singapore	DNP
2011	6 Nations Cup	Singapore	5th
2012	6 Nations Cup	Singapore	4th
2013	6 Nations Cup	Singapore	4th
2014	6 Nations Cup	Singapore	DNP
2015	5 Nations Cup	Singapore	DNP
2016	6 Nations Cup	Singapore	DNP
2017	6 Nations Cup	Singapore	DNP

== Players ==
=== 2015 Sri Lanka Netball World Cup Team ===
Sri Lanka national netball team
Players	Coaching staff
Deepika Abeykoon; Dharshika Abeywickrama; Thishala Algama; Semini Alwis (c); Tharjini Sivalingam; Gayanjali Amarawansa; Gayani Dissanayake; Sureka Kumari Gamage; Chathurangi Jayasooriya; Hasitha Mendis; Niroshini Paiva; Viraji Pethigoda; Thilini Waththegedera	Head coach: Deepthi Alwis

=== 2019 Sri Lanka Netball World Cup Team ===
Sri Lanka National Netball Team
Players	Coaching Staff
Gayanjali Amarawansa; Dharshika Abeywickrama; Hasitha Mendis; Dulanga Abeygoda; Dulangi Wannithileka; Thilini Waththegedera; Nauchalee Rajapakse; Tharjini Sivalingam; Deepika Dharshani Abekoon; Chathurangi Jayasooriya (c); Gayani Dissanayake (VC); Elilenthini Sethukavalar	Head coach: Thilaka Jinadasa

== See also ==
- Netball in Sri Lanka
