= 2012 Asian Netball Championships =

Tournament details
- Host country: Sri Lanka
- Dates: 25–31 August 2012
- Teams: 10

Final positions
- Champions: Singapore
- Runner-up: Sri Lanka
- Third place: Malaysia

The 2012 Asian Netball Championships was the 8th edition of the tournament. The tournament was played at the Sugathadasa Indoor Stadium in Colombo, Sri Lanka from 25 August to 31 August with ten Asian national netball teams.

== Final draw ==
The final draw used the world rankings to sort the teams in a serpentine format. Japan and Brunei made their international debut.

Pot 1	Pot 2
Sri Lanka (1); Hong Kong (4); India (5); Nepal (8); Japan (9)	Singapore (2); Malaysia (3); Maldives (6); Pakistan (7); Brunei (10)

== Preliminary round ==
All times are SLST (UTC+5:30)

Qualified for the semifinals

All results are here.

=== Group A ===
Team	Pld	W	D	L	GF	GA	GD	Pts
Sri Lanka	4	4	0	0	403	79	+324	8
Hong Kong	4	3	0	1	236	132	+134	6
India	4	2	0	2	205	167	+38	4
Japan	4	1	0	3	100	262	-162	2
Nepal	4	0	0	4	37	339	-302	0

25 August; 11:30	Sri Lanka	81 – 38	Hong Kong	Sugathadasa Indoor Stadium, Colombo

25 August; 15:00	India	64 – 17	Japan	Sugathadasa Indoor Stadium, Colombo

26 August; 12:45	Sri Lanka	85 – 29	India	Sugathadasa Indoor Stadium, Colombo

26 August; 14:30	Nepal	27 – 52	Japan	Sugathadasa Indoor Stadium, Colombo

27 August; 11:00	Sri Lanka	127 – 3	Nepal	Sugathadasa Indoor Stadium, Colombo

27 August; 14:30	Hong Kong	60 – 29	India	Sugathadasa Indoor Stadium, Colombo

28 August; 11:00	Sri Lanka	110 – 8	Japan	Sugathadasa Indoor Stadium, Colombo

28 August; 14:30	Hong Kong	77 – 2	Nepal	Sugathadasa Indoor Stadium, Colombo

29 August; 11:00	Hong Kong	61 – 22	Japan	Sugathadasa Indoor Stadium, Colombo

29 August; 12:45	India	83 – 5	Nepal	Sugathadasa Indoor Stadium, Colombo

=== Group B ===
Team	Pld	W	D	L	GF	GA	GD	Pts
Singapore	4	4	0	0	306	65	+242	8
Malaysia	4	3	0	1	270	77	+193	6
Brunei	4	1	1	2	146	187	-41	3
Maldives	4	1	1	2	146	195	-49	3
Pakistan	4	0	0	4	39	383	-344	0

25 August; 13:15	Singapore	38 – 34	Malaysia	Sugathadasa Indoor Stadium, Colombo

25 August; 16:45	Maldives	26 – 26	Brunei	Sugathadasa Indoor Stadium, Colombo

26 August; 11:00	Singapore	82 – 11	Maldives	Sugathadasa Indoor Stadium, Colombo

26 August; 16:15	Pakistan	13 – 91	Brunei	Sugathadasa Indoor Stadium, Colombo

27 August; 12:45	Singapore	111 – 2	Pakistan	Sugathadasa Indoor Stadium, Colombo

27 August; 14:15	Malaysia	70 – 22	Maldives	Sugathadasa Indoor Stadium, Colombo

28 August; 12:45	Singapore	76 – 18	Brunei	Sugathadasa Indoor Stadium, Colombo

28 August; 4:15	Malaysia	94 – 7	Pakistan	Sugathadasa Indoor Stadium, Colombo

20 August; 14:30	Malaysia	72 – 11	Brunei	Sugathadasa Indoor Stadium, Colombo

29 August; 4:15	Maldives	87 – 17	Pakistan	Sugathadasa Indoor Stadium, Colombo

== Playoff matches ==
5th to 8th

30 August	India	41–40	Maldives

30 August	Brunei	46–38	Japan

== Knockout round ==
Semi finals
30 August
Sri Lanka	67
Malaysia	58
30 August
Singapore	53
Hong Kong	27

Final
31 August
Sri Lanka	47
Singapore	48
Bronze medal match
31 August
Malaysia	56
Hong Kong	27
