= 2014 Asian Netball Championships =

Tournament details
- Host country: Singapore
- Dates: 7–14 September 2014
- Teams: 10

Final positions
- Champions: Singapore (4th title)
- Runner-up: Sri Lanka
- Third place: Malaysia

The 2014 Asian Netball Championships was the ninth edition of the Asian Netball Championships. The competition took place between 7-14 September with the tournament being held in Singapore. Ten teams competed in the tournament with Singapore winning the championship over Sri Lanka

== Final draw ==
The final draw used the world rankings to sort the teams in a serpentine format.

| Pot 1 | Pot 2 |
|---|---|
| Singapore (1); Hong Kong (4); India (5); Japan (7); Vietnam (9) | Sri Lanka (2); Malaysia (3); Brunei (6); Chinese Taipei (8); Myanmar (10) |

=== Group A ===
| Team | Pld | W | D | L | GF | GA | GD | Pts |
|---|---|---|---|---|---|---|---|---|
| Singapore | 4 | 4 | 0 | 0 | 287 | 69 | +218 | 8 |
| Hong Kong | 4 | 3 | 0 | 1 | 258 | 121 | +137 | 6 |
| India | 4 | 2 | 0 | 2 | 153 | 241 | −62 | 4 |
| Japan | 4 | 1 | 0 | 3 | 143 | 216 | −73 | 2 |
| Myanmar | 4 | 0 | 0 | 4 | 80 | 274 | −194 | 0 |

=== Group B ===
| Team | Pld | W | D | L | GF | GA | GD | Pts |
|---|---|---|---|---|---|---|---|---|
| Sri Lanka | 4 | 4 | 0 | 0 | 310 | 134 | +176 | 8 |
| Malaysia | 4 | 3 | 0 | 1 | 291 | 136 | +155 | 6 |
| Brunei | 4 | 2 | 0 | 2 | 187 | 174 | +13 | 4 |
| Chinese Taipei | 4 | 1 | 0 | 3 | 133 | 245 | −112 | 2 |
| Vietnam | 4 | 0 | 0 | 4 | 84 | 316 | −232 | 0 |

== Play-off matches ==
=== Ninth place play-off ===
| 13 September 2018 | Vietnam | 26–61 | Myanmar |

=== Seventh place play-off ===
| 14 September 2018 | Brunei | 44–37 | Japan |

=== Fifth place play-off ===
| 14 September 2018 | India | 44–66 | Chinese Taipei |

== Knockout round ==
Semi finals
13 September
Singapore | 46
Malaysia | 39
13 September
Sri Lanka | 57
Hong Kong | 42

Final
14 September
Singapore | 59
Sri Lanka | 41
Bronze medal match
14 September
Malaysia | 50
Hong Kong | 39
