= Singapore national netball team =

Singapore
- Nickname(s): Singapore Vandas
- Association: Netball Singapore
- Confederation: Asia Netball
- Head coach: Tara Steel
- Asst coach: Dewi Zainal
- Manager: Low Hui Yu
- Captain: Toh Kai Wei
- Vice-captain: Angelina Lim & Rachel Ling
- Most caps: Charmaine Soh (128)
- World ranking: 23 (2026)
Team colours	Alternate

Largest win
- Singapore 122–3 Iraq (India; 18 October 2024)

Netball World Cup
- Appearances: 8 (Debuted in 1967)
- 2023 placing: 15th
- Best result: 8th (1967)

Commonwealth Games
- Appearances: 1 (Debuted in 2006)
- Best result: 11th (2006)

The Singapore national netball team are the national netball team representing Singapore. The Singapore team have competed at the Netball World Cup eleven times (1967, 1975, 1983, 1991, 1995, 1999, 2007, 2011, 2015, 2019 and 2023) and hosted the World Cup twice (1983, 2011).

They have won five Asian Netball Championships (2005, 2012, 2014, 2024, 2026), three Nations Cup titles (2006, 2007 and 2023) and one Southeast Asian Games gold medal (2015).

In 2005, the team won their first Asian Netball Championship with a win over the Malaysian team, scoring 53–39 in the finals.

In 2015, the team clinched the Southeast Asian Games gold medal edging out rivals Malaysia, 46-43 in the final.

The team was also named 2025 Team of the Year (Team Sport) at the Singapore Sports Awards.

As of 11th November 2026, Singapore are 22nd on the World Netball Rankings.

== Players ==
The following 12 players represented Singapore at the 2026 Netball Singapore Nations Cup

- Toh Kai Wei
- Charlotte Lee
- Amandeep Kaur Chahal
- Goh Wei Ping
- Angelina Lim
- Anna Macinnes
- Rachel Ling Ru Qing
- Reena Divya D/O Manogaran
- Tan Yi Jie
- Faithmaria Lawrence
- K. Mishalenee
- Jamie Lim

== Competitive history ==
Netball World Cup
Year	Championship	Location	Placing
1967	2nd World Championships	Perth, Australia	8th
1975	4th World Championships	Auckland, New Zealand	10th
1983	6th World Championships	Singapore	10th
1991	8th World Championships	Sydney, Australia	18th
1995	9th World Championships	Birmingham, England	20th
1999	10th World Championships	Christchurch, New Zealand	12th
2007	12th World Championships	Auckland, New Zealand	15th
2011	13th World Championships	Singapore	15th
2015	14th World Cup	Sydney, Australia	15th
2019	15th World Cup	Liverpool, England	16th
2023	16th World Cup	Cape Town, South Africa	15th

Asian Netball Championships
Year	Cup	Location	Placing
1985	1st Asian Championships	Kuala Lumpur, Malaysia	3rd
1989	2nd Asian Championships	New Delhi, India	2nd
1993	3rd Asian Championships	Hong Kong	2nd
1997	4th Asian Championships	Singapore	3rd
2001	5th Asian Championships	Colombo, Sri Lanka	2nd
2005	6th Asian Championships	Singapore	1st
2009	7th Asian Championships	Kuala Lumpur, Malaysia	2nd
2012	8th Asian Championships	Colombo, Sri Lanka	1st
2014	9th Asian Championships	Singapore	1st
2016	10th Asian Championships	Bangkok, Thailand	3rd
2018	11th Asian Championships	Singapore	2nd
2022	12th Asian Championships	Singapore	2nd
2024	13th Asian Championships	Bengaluru, India	1st
2026	14th Asian Championships	Hong Kong	1st

Nations Cup
Year	Cup	Location	Placing
2006	4 Nations Cup	Singapore	1st
2007	5 Nations Cup	Singapore	1st
2008	5 Nations Cup	Singapore	5th
2009	6 Nations Cup	Singapore	5th
2010	6 Nations Cup	Singapore	4th
2011	6 Nations Cup	Singapore	2nd
2012	6 Nations Cup	Singapore	5th
2013	6 Nations Cup	Singapore	2nd
2014	6 Nations Cup	Singapore	2nd
2015	6 Nations Cup	Singapore	3rd
2016	6 Nations Cup	Singapore	4th
2017	6 Nations Cup	Singapore	3rd
2019	6 Nations Cup	Singapore	2nd
2022	6 Nations Cup	Singapore	3rd
2023	Mirxes Nations Cup	Singapore	1st
2024	Mirxes Nations Cup	Singapore	2nd
2025	Singlife Nations Cup	Singapore	2nd

Southeast Asian Games
Year	Games	Location	Placing
2001	2001 Southeast Asian Games	Kuala Lumpur, Malaysia	2nd
2015	2015 Southeast Asian Games	Singapore	1st
2017	2017 Southeast Asian Games	Kuala Lumpur, Malaysia	2nd
2019	2019 Southeast Asian Games	Santa Rosa, Laguna, Philippines	2nd
2025	2025 Southeast Asian Games	Bangkok, Thailand	2nd

UAE Netball Cup
Year	Games	Location	Placing
2025	UAE Netball Cup 2025	Dubai, United Arab Emirates	2nd

Spirit Series
Year	Games	Location	Placing
2026	Spirit Series	Sydney, Australia	2nd

== Head coaches ==
Coach	Years
Kate Carpenter	2004-2007, 2010-2012
(Australia) Jill McIntosh	2009 - 2011
(New Zealand) Annette Pearce	2020 - 2024
(Singapore) Yeo Mee Hong (Interim)	2024 - 2025
(Australia) Tara Steel	2025 - Present
