= Hong Kong national netball team =

Hong Kong
- Association: Hong Kong Netball Association
- Confederation: Netball Asia
- Head coach: Dion Te Whetu
- Asst coach: Veronica Arnold
- Manager: Christina Yue
- Captain: Connie Wong and Kate Jolly
- World ranking: 33 ▲
Primary	Alternate

The Hong Kong national netball team represents Hong Kong in international netball competitions. They regularly compete in the biennial Asian Netball Championship, a key tournament in the region.

== 2018 National Open Team ANC ==
Hong Kong national netball team
Players	Coaching staff
Michelle Arkell; Helene Bibeau; Natassia Brakenridge; Kalani Brown; Chan Ka Yan; Elise Daly; Krystle Edwards; Kate Jolly; Lo Fung Yee; Rebecca Miller; Tai Ka Yan; Connie Wong	Head coach: Robin Manihera; Assistant coach: Veronica Arnold

== Netball in Hong Kong ==
The senior women's team was previously coached by New Zealander Robin Manihera, who stepped down in 2019. In 2020, Dion Te Whetu, also from New Zealand, was appointed as the head coach. In addition to leading the women's team, Te Whetu oversees high-performance netball programs in Hong Kong, including the men's team.

In 1994, Hong Kong hosted the inaugural Asian Youth Netball Championship. The Hong Kong national team participated in the fifth Asian Netball Championship, held in Colombo, Sri Lanka, in 2001. They also competed in the 7th Asian Youth Netball Championship, which took place in India in 2010.

== Bibliography ==
- Government of Sri Lanka (21 July 2001). "5th Asian Netball Championship next week in Colombo". Archived from the original on 26 January 2004.
- Hong Kong Netball Association (1 September 2018)."Hong Kong Open National Team 2018". https://netball.org.hk/hkopen-national-team-18/
- International Federation of Netball Associations (21 January 2011a). "Current World Rankings". Archived from the original on 19 May 2011.
- Netball Singapore (2011b). "Milestones". Archived from the original on 18 February 2011.
- Sagar, Naresh (4 July 2010). "Asian Youth Netball Championship". Sagar Media.
- Searle, Jamie (1 September 2020). "Former Southlander appointed Hong Kong's head netball coach". Stuff.co.nz.
