= Pakistan Netball Federation =

Pakistani sports governing body

- Sport: Netball
- Abbreviation: PNF
- Founded: 1998
- Affiliation: WORLD NETBALL
- Affiliation date: 1998
- Regional affiliation: NETBALL ASIA
- Affiliation date: 1998
- President: Mudassar Razak Arain
- Secretary: Muhammad Riaz
- (Pakistan)

The Pakistan Netball Federation (PNF) is the national governing body responsible for developing and promoting the sport of netball in Pakistan. The Federation was formed in 1996.

The PNF organizes the National Netball Championships annually.

== Affiliations ==
The Federation is affiliated with:

- WORLD NETBALL
- NETBALL ASIA
- Pakistan Olympic Association
- Copyright Registry, Govt. of Pakistan
- Trademark Registry, Ministry of IPO, Govt. of Pakistan
- Society Registration Act 1860
- Ministry of IPC, Govt. of Pakistan
- Pakistan Sports Board
