= 2018 Asian Netball Championships =

11th edition of the Asian Netball Championships

Tournament details
- Host country: Singapore
- Dates: 1–9 September 2018
- Teams: 12

Final positions
- Champions: Sri Lanka (5th title)
- Runners-up: Singapore
- Third place: Malaysia

The 2018 Asian Netball Championships is the 11th edition of the Asian Netball Championships was held in Singapore. The championships which was held at the OCBC Arena at the Singapore Sports Hub from September 1–9.

In the final, Sri Lanka won their fifth Asian title by defeating Singapore 69-50 as both teams qualified through to the 2019 Netball World Cup as the Asian representatives. Tharjini Sivalingam of Sri Lanka received the Player of the tournament award for her outstanding aggressive skills as she made a comeback into the national team after a three-year hiatus.

== Preliminary round ==
=== Group A ===
Team	Pld	W	D	L	GF	GA	GD	Pts
Malaysia	2	2	0	0	162	26	+136	4
Japan	2	1	0	1	48	122	−74	2
Maldives	2	0	0	2	47	109	−62	0

1 September; 15:00	Malaysia	88–13	Japan	OCBC Arena, Singapore

2 September; 13:00	Maldives	13–74	Malaysia	OCBC Arena, Singapore

3 September; 17:00	Japan	35–34	Maldives	OCBC Arena, Singapore

=== Group B ===
Team	Pld	W	D	L	GF	GA	GD	Pts
Sri Lanka	2	2	0	0	238	34	+204	4
India	2	1	0	1	104	126	−22	2
Chinese Taipei	2	0	0	2	30	212	−182	0

1 September; 17:00	Chinese Taipei	5–137	Sri Lanka	OCBC Arena, Singapore

2 September; 15:00	Sri Lanka	101–29	India	OCBC Arena, Singapore

3 September; 13:00	India	75–25	Chinese Taipei	OCBC Arena, Singapore

=== Group C ===
Team	Pld	W	D	L	GF	GA	GD	Pts
Singapore	2	2	0	0	152	36	+116	4
Brunei	2	1	0	1	81	84	−3	2
Pakistan	2	0	0	2	33	146	−113	0

1 September; 13:00	Singapore	68–19	Brunei	OCBC Arena, Singapore

2 September; 17:00	Singapore	84–17	Pakistan	OCBC Arena, Singapore

3 September; 19:00	Brunei	62–19	Pakistan	OCBC Arena, Singapore

=== Group D ===
Team	Pld	W	D	L	GF	GA	GD	Pts
Hong Kong	2	2	0	0	138	53	+85	4
Thailand	2	1	0	1	109	101	+8	2
Philippines	2	0	0	2	51	144	−93	0

1 September; 19:00	Philippines	36–71	Thailand	OCBC Arena, Singapore

2 September; 19:00	Thailand	38–65	Hong Kong	OCBC Arena, Singapore

3 September; 15:00	Hong Kong	73–15	Philippines	OCBC Arena, Singapore

== Follow-up Group ==
=== Group E (Cup) ===
Pos	Team	Pld	W	D	L	GF	GA	GD	Pts
1	Sri Lanka	3	3	0	0	207	168	+39	6
2	Malaysia	3	1	0	2	167	161	+6	2
3	Singapore	3	1	0	2	166	179	−13	2
4	Hong Kong	3	1	0	2	141	173	−32	2

4 September 2018; 17:00	Malaysia	53–43	Hong Kong	OCBC Arena, Singapore

4 September 2018; 19:00	Sri Lanka	74–61	Singapore	OCBC Arena, Singapore

5 September 2018; 17:00	Malaysia	59–62	Sri Lanka	OCBC Arena, Singapore

5 September 2018; 19:00	Singapore	49–50	Hong Kong	OCBC Arena, Singapore

6 September 2018; 17:00	Sri Lanka	71–48	Hong Kong	OCBC Arena, Singapore

6 September 2018; 19:00	Singapore	56–55	Malaysia	OCBC Arena, Singapore

=== Group F (Plate) ===
Pos	Team	Pld	W	D	L	GF	GA	GD	Pts
1	Thailand	3	3	0	0	192	102	+90	6
2	Brunei	3	2	0	1	144	139	+5	4
3	India	3	1	0	2	148	172	−24	2
4	Japan	3	0	0	3	116	187	−71	0

4 September 2018; 09:00	Brunei	33–66	Thailand	OCBC Arena, Singapore

4 September 2018; 13:00	Japan	57–65	India	OCBC Arena, Singapore

5 September 2018; 13:00	India	42–64	Thailand	OCBC Arena, Singapore

5 September 2018; 15:00	Brunei	60–32	Japan	OCBC Arena, Singapore

6 September 2018; 09:00	India	41–51	Brunei	OCBC Arena, Singapore

6 September 2018; 11:00	Japan	27–62	Thailand	OCBC Arena, Singapore

=== Group G (Bowl) ===
Pos	Team	Pld	W	D	L	GF	GA	GD	Pts
1	Philippines	3	3	0	0	185	101	+87	6
2	Maldives	3	2	0	1	177	94	+83	4
3	Pakistan	3	1	0	2	137	146	−9	2
4	Chinese Taipei	3	0	0	3	55	213	−158	0

4 September 2018; 11:00	Pakistan	36–62	Philippines	OCBC Arena, Singapore

4 September 2018; 15:00	Maldives	73–10	Chinese Taipei	OCBC Arena, Singapore

5 September 2018; 9:00	Chinese Taipei	21–73	Philippines	OCBC Arena, Singapore

5 September 2018; 11:00	Pakistan	34–60	Maldives	OCBC Arena, Singapore

6 September 2018; 13:00	Chinese Taipei	24–67	Pakistan	OCBC Arena, Singapore

6 September 2018; 15:00	Maldives	44–50	Philippines	OCBC Arena, Singapore

== Play-off matches ==
=== 11th place play-off ===
8 September 2018; 10:30	Pakistan	82–27	Chinese Taipei	OCBC Arena, Singapore

=== 9th place play-off ===
8 September 2018; 13:00	Philippines	49–37	Maldives	OCBC Arena, Singapore

=== 7th place play-off ===
9 September 2018; 10:00	India	54–57	Japan	OCBC Arena, Singapore

=== 5th place play-off ===
9 September 2018; 12:00	Thailand	70–34	Brunei	OCBC Arena, Singapore

== Knockout stage ==
=== Semi-finals ===
08 September 2018; 15:00	Sri Lanka	55–46	Hong Kong	OCBC Arena, Singapore

08 September 2018; 17:00	Malaysia	43–51	Singapore	OCBC Arena, Singapore

=== 3rd place play-off ===
09 September 2018; 14:00	Hong Kong	46–52	Malaysia	OCBC Arena, Singapore

=== Final ===
09 September 2018; 16:00	Sri Lanka	69–50	Singapore	OCBC Arena, Singapore

== Final Placements ==
Place	Nation
Gold	Sri Lanka
Silver	Singapore
Bronze	Malaysia
4	Hong Kong
5	Thailand
6	Brunei
7	Japan
8	India
9	Philippines
10	Maldives
11	Pakistan
12	Chinese Taipei
