= Asian Netball Championships =

Netball competition

Asian Netball Championship
- Current season, competition or edition: 2024 Asian Netball Championships
- Sport: Netball
- First season: 1985
- Administrator: Asia Netball
- No. of teams: 12 (2018)
- Most recent champion: Singapore (2024)
- Most titles: Sri Lanka (6 titles)

The Asian Netball Championship is a netball competition held every two years with teams from across Asia competing. First 7 editions were held every four years, then changed to every two years starting from 2012. Sri Lanka is the reigning champion of the tournament and also the most successful team, having won the Asian Netball Championships 6 times. Singapore has 3 championships and Malaysia has two. From the first edition of the tournament held in 1985, Sri Lanka, Singapore and Malaysia have dominated by always finishing within the top three. The only exception is the 3rd edition of the tournament held in 1993 where host nation Hong Kong won the championship.

== Results ==
=== Women ===
#	Year	1st	2nd	3rd	Venue	Number of teams
1	1985	Malaysia	Sri Lanka	Singapore	Kuala Lumpur	5
2	1989	Sri Lanka	Singapore	Malaysia	New Delhi	4
3	1993	Hong Kong	Singapore	Sri Lanka	Hong Kong	5
4	1997	Sri Lanka	Malaysia	Singapore	Singapore	5
5	2001	Sri Lanka	Singapore	Malaysia	Colombo, Sri Lanka	8
6	2005	Singapore	Malaysia	Sri Lanka	Toa Payoh Sports Hall	7
7	2009	Sri Lanka	Singapore	Malaysia	Juara Stadium	9
8	2012	Singapore	Sri Lanka	Malaysia	Sugathadasa Indoor Stadium, Colombo, Sri Lanka	10
9	2014	Singapore	Sri Lanka	Malaysia	Singapore Sports Hub	10
10	2016	Malaysia	Sri Lanka	Singapore	Thailand	9
11	2018	Sri Lanka	Singapore	Malaysia	Singapore Sports Hub	12
-	2020	Cancelled due to COVID-19 pandemic			South Korea	—N/a
12	2022	Sri Lanka	Singapore	Malaysia	Singapore Sports Hub	11
13	2024	Singapore	Sri Lanka	Malaysia	Koramangala Indoor Stadium	14

=== Men ===
1. 2016 Games: Malaysia,Pakistan,India (6 Teams)
2. 2017 Games: India,Pakistan,Singapore (5 Teams)

== Medals ==
=== Women (1985-2024) ===
Rank	Nation	Gold	Silver	Bronze	Total
1	Sri Lanka (SRI)	6	5	2	13
2	Singapore (SIN)	4	6	3	13
3	Malaysia (MAS)	2	2	8	12
4	Hong Kong (HKG)	1	0	0	1
Totals (4 entries)		13	13	13	39

=== Men (2016-2017) ===
Rank	Nation	Gold	Silver	Bronze	Total
1	India (IND)	1	0	1	2
2	Malaysia (MAS)	1	0	0	1
3	Pakistan (PAK)	0	2	0	2
4	Singapore (SIN)	0	0	1	1
Totals (4 entries)		2	2	2	6

== Participating nations ==
=== Women ===
Team	(Malaysia) 1985	(India) 1989	(Hong Kong) 1993	(Singapore) 1997	(Sri Lanka) 2001	(Singapore) 2005	(Malaysia) 2009	(Sri Lanka) 2012	(Singapore) 2014	(Thailand) 2016	(Singapore) 2018	(Singapore) 2022	(India) 2024	Total
Bahrain	–	–	–	–	–	–	–	–	–	–	–	–	12th	1
Brunei	–	–	–	–	–	–	–	6th	7th	6th	6th	6th	7th	6
Chinese Taipei	–	–	–	–	–	–	6th	–	5th	7th	12th	9th	10th	6
Hong Kong	4th	–	1st	–	5th	5th	5th	4th	4th	4th	4th	4th	4th	11
India	5th	4th	5th	4th	6th	7th	7th	5th	6th	–	8th	8th	9th	12
Iraq	–	–	–	–	–	–	–	–	–	–	–	–	14th	1
Japan	–	–	–	–	–	–	–	8th	8th	8th	7th	10th	11th	6
Malaysia	1st	3rd	4th	2nd	3rd	2nd	3rd	3rd	3rd	1st	3rd	3rd	3rd	13
Maldives	–	–	–	5th	7th	5th	8th	7th	–	9th	10th	7th	8th	9
Myanmar	–	–	–	–	–	–	–	–	–	9th	–	–	–	1
Nepal	–	–	–	–	–	–	–	9th	–	–	–	–	–	1
Pakistan	–	–	–	–	8th	–	9th	10th	–	–	11th	–	–	4
Philippines	–	–	–	–	–	–	–	–	–	–	9th	5th	6th	3
Saudi Arabia	–	–	–	–	–	–	–	–	–	–	–	–	13th	1
Singapore	3rd	2nd	2nd	3rd	2nd	1st	2nd	1st	1st	3rd	2nd	2nd	1st	13
Sri Lanka	2nd	1st	3rd	1st	1st	3rd	1st	2nd	2nd	2nd	1st	1st	2nd	13
Thailand	–	–	–	–	4th	4th	4th	–	–	5th	5th	–	5th	6
Vietnam	–	–	–	–	–	–	–	–	10th	–	–	–	–	1
