= 2019 Netball World Cup squads =

2019 Netball World Cup squads. This is a list of squads selected for the 2019 Netball World Cup.

== Group A ==
=== Australia ===
Caitlin Bassett (Captain), April Brandley, Kelsey Browne, Courtney Bruce, Paige Hadley, Sarah Klau, Jamie-Lee Price, Caitlin Thwaites, Gretel Tippett, Liz Watson (vice-captain), Jo Weston, Stephanie Wood.

=== Northern Ireland ===
Northern Ireland – 2019 Netball World Cup roster
Players
Coaches

Name	Pos	DOB	Height	Club	Nat	Caps
Lisa Bowman	GS	2 November 1988 (aged 30)	1.88 m (6 ft 2 in)
Niamh Cooper	WA, C, WD	29 July 1992 (aged 26)	1.74 m (5 ft 9 in)	Kingsway	(Northern Ireland)	43
Shaunagh Craig	GA, GS	5 April 1993 (aged 26)	1.87 m (6 ft 2 in)	Belfast Ladies	(Northern Ireland)	0
Ciara Crosbie	GS, GA	17 July 1994 (aged 24)	1.80 m (5 ft 11 in)	Belfast Ladies	(Northern Ireland)	9
Michelle Drayne	WD, C, WA	22 September 1988 (aged 29)	1.67 m (5 ft 6 in)	Saracens Mavericks	(England)	58
Noleen Lennon	GS, GK	22 March 1984 (aged 35)	1.86 m (6 ft 1 in)	Belfast Ladies	(Northern Ireland)
Gemma Lawlor	GK, GD	30 April 1987 (aged 32)	1.79 m (5 ft 10 in)	Belfast Ladies	(Northern Ireland)	87
Emma Magee	WA, GA, GS	11 November 1997 (aged 21)	1.76 m (5 ft 9 in)	Westside	(Northern Ireland)	2
Michelle Magee	WD, GD	13 January 2000 (aged 19)	1.80 m (5 ft 11 in)	Kingsway	(Northern Ireland)	11
Lisa McCaffrey	WA, C, WD	26 September 1986 (aged 32)	1.69 m (5 ft 7 in)	Belfast Ladies	(Northern Ireland)	56
Caroline O'Hanlon (c)	C, WA	8 August 1984 (aged 34)	1.74 m (5 ft 9 in)	Manchester Thunder	(England)	96
Fionnuala Toner	WD, GD	6 March 1990 (aged 29)	1.76 m (5 ft 9 in)	London Pulse	(England)	75
Neamh Woods	WA, C, WD	3 May 1989 (aged 30)	1.70 m (5 ft 7 in)	Larkfield	(Northern Ireland)	30

Head coach

- Dan Ryan

Notes

- (c) – Captain
- (cc) – Co-captain
- (vc) – Vice-captain
- – Injury / maternity leave
- (TRP) – Temporary Replacement Player

=== Sri Lanka ===
Chathurangi Jayasooriya, Dharshika Abeywickrama, Gayani Dissanayake, Tharjini Sivalingam, Thilini Waththegedara, Gayanjali Amarawansa, Hasitha Mendis, Deepika Darshani, Dulangi Wannithilake, Dulanga Dhananji, Elilenthini Sethukavalar, Nauchalee Rajapakse

=== Zimbabwe ===
Adelaide Muskwe, Claris Kwaramba, Felisitus Kwangwa, Joice Takaidza, Ndaizivei Madzikangava, Patricia Mauladi, Pauline Jani, Perpetua Siyachitema (Captain), Rudo Karume, Sharon Bwanali, Sharleen Makusha, Ursula Ndlovu

== Group B ==
=== Barbados ===
Amanda Knight, Brianna Holder, Damisha Croney, Latonia Blackman, Rhe-Ann Niles-Mapp, Rieah Holder, Samantha Browne, Sheniqua Thomas, Shonica Wharton, Shonette Azore-Bruce, Shonte Seale, Tonisha Rock-Yaw

=== Malawi ===
Thandie Galleta, Joanna Kachilika, Alinafe Kamwala, Bridget Kumwenda, Caroline Mtukule, Loreen Ngwira, Sindi Simtowe, Jane Chimaliro, Takondwa Lwazi, Joyce Mvula, Grace Mwafulirwa, Towera Vinkhumbo

=== New Zealand ===
Maria Folau, Laura Langman (Captain), Ameliaranne Ekenasio, Gina Crampton, Bailey Mes, Casey Kopua, Jane Watson, Shannon Saunders, Karin Burger, Phoenix Karaka, Katrina Rore, Te Paea Selby-Rickit

=== Singapore ===
Pei Shan Lee, Charmaine Soh, Xinyi Tan, Kai Wei Toh, Carmen Goh, Kimberly Lim, Shawallah Rashid, Shuyi Kwok, Aqilah Andin, Melody Teo, Sindhu Nair, Joanna Toh

== Group C ==
=== Fiji ===
Kaitlyn Fisher, Episake Kahatoka, Alisi Galo, Kelera Nawai, Lydia Panapasa, Unaisi Rauluni, Aliti Toribau, Adi Vakaoca Bolakoro, Ema Mualuvu, Asilika Sevutia, Matila Vocea, Laisani Waqa

=== Jamaica ===
Romelda Aiken, Jhanielle Fowler-Reid (Captain), Vangelee Williams, Jodi-Ann Ward, Stacian Facey, Shanice Beckford, Adean Thomas, Nicole Dixon, Khadijah Williams, Kadie-Ann Dehaney, Shamera Sterling, Rebekah Robinson

=== South Africa ===
Lenize Potgieter, Erin Burger, Maryka Holtzhausen, Renske Stoltz, Ine-Marí Venter, Izette Griesel, Khanyisa Chawane, Bongiwe Msomi (Captain), Shadine van der Merwe, Karla Pretorius, Phumza Maweni, Zanele Vimbela

=== Trinidad and Tobago ===
Jameela McCarthy, Tahirah Hollingsworth, Kalifa MCollin, Samantha Wallace, Daystar Swift, Shaquanda Queena, Onella Jack-Hill, Aniecia Baptiste, Rhonda John-Davis, Shantel Seemungal, Shernece Seemungal, Candice Guerero

== Group D ==
=== England ===
England Roses roster
Players
Coaches

Name	Pos	DOB	Height	Club	Nat	Caps
Helen Housby	GA, GS	19/01/1995	1.83 m (6 ft 0 in)	New South Wales Swifts	(Australia)	58
Joanne Harten	GS, GA	21/03/1989	1.88 m (6 ft 2 in)	Giants Netball	(Australia)	99
Natalie Haythornthwaite	WA, GA	09/12/1992	1.74 m (5 ft 9 in)	New South Wales Swifts	(Australia)	36
Rachel Dunn	GS, GA	14/11/1982	1.87 m (6 ft 2 in)	Wasps Netball	(England)	86
Serena Guthrie (c)	WD, C	05/01/1990	1.80 m (5 ft 11 in)	Team Bath	(England)	90
Jade Clarke (vc)	C, WD, WA	17/10/1983	1.74 m (5 ft 9 in)	Wasps Netball	(England)	161
Chelsea Pitman	WA, GA	8/06/1988	1.81 m (5 ft 11 in)	Adelaide Thunderbirds	(Australia)	28
Natalie Panagarry	C, WA	27/12/1990	1.70 m (5 ft 7 in)	Loughborough Lightning	(England)	8
Layla Guscoth	GD, WD, GK	03/02/1992	1.83 m (6 ft 0 in)	Adelaide Thunderbirds	(Australia)	24
Eboni Usoro-Brown	GK, GD	04/02/1988	1.85 m (6 ft 1 in)	Team Bath	(England)	96
Geva Mentor	GK, GD	17/09/1984	1.91 m (6 ft 3 in)	Collingwood Magpies	(Australia)	138
Francesca Williams	GD, WD	23/12/1997	1.88 m (6 ft 2 in)	Wasps Netball	(England)	3

Head coach

- Tracey Neville

Notes

- (c) – Captain
- (cc) – Co-captain
- (vc) – Vice-captain
- – Injury / maternity leave
- (TRP) – Temporary Replacement Player

=== Samoa ===
Ann Helen Nu'uali'itia, Ariana Luamanu, Toa Tanimo, Brooke Amber Williams, Eseta Autagavaia, Gene Nafanua Solia-Gibb, Lenora Misa, Rachel Rasmussen, Sanita To’o, Afi Lafaiali’i-Sapolu, Soli Ropati, Tee Salanoa

=== Scotland ===
Scotland – 2019 Netball World Cup roster
Players
Coaches

Name	Pos	DOB	Height	Club	Nat	Caps
Emma Barrie	GS, GK	13 April 2002 (aged 17)	1.94 m (6 ft 4 in)	Sirens	(Scotland)
Kelly Boyle	WA, C	11 May 1996 (aged 23)	1.65 m (5 ft 5 in)	Sirens	(Scotland)
Lynsey Gallagher	GS, GA, WA	20 May 1992 (aged 27)	1.75 m (5 ft 9 in)	Sirens	(Scotland)
Ella Gibbons	GD, GK	24 November 1994 (aged 24)	1.91 m (6 ft 3 in)	Sirens	(Scotland)
Bethan Goodwin	GS, GA	4 July 1999 (aged 20)	1.85 m (6 ft 1 in)	Sirens	(Scotland)
Claire Maxwell (c)	C, WD	10 August 1988 (aged 30)	1.75 m (5 ft 9 in)	Sirens	(Scotland)
Niamh McCall	GA, WA	28 April 2000 (aged 19)	1.78 m (5 ft 10 in)	Sirens	(Scotland)
Nicola McCleery	WA, C	12 October 1995 (aged 23)	1.68 m (5 ft 6 in)	Sirens	(Scotland)
Sarah MacPhail	GD, WD, C	8 August 1997 (aged 21)	1.78 m (5 ft 10 in)	Sirens	(Scotland)
Hayley Mulheron	GK, GD	27 April 1986 (aged 33)	1.85 m (6 ft 1 in)	Sirens	(Scotland)
Emily Nicholl	GD, WD	24 May 1994 (aged 25)	1.80 m (5 ft 11 in)	Sirens	(Scotland)
Lauren Tait	GK, GD, WD	10 August 1996 (aged 22)	1.86 m (6 ft 1 in)	Glasgow Saltires	(Scotland)

Head coach

- Gail Parata

Assistant coach

- Jill Fullarton
  Lesley MacDonald

Manager: Karen McElveen
Physiotherapist: Sarah Chambers

Notes

- (c) – Captain
- (cc) – Co-captain
- (vc) – Vice-captain
- – Injury / maternity leave
- (TRP) – Temporary Replacement Player

=== Uganda ===
Peace Proscovia (Captain), Mary Cholhok Nuba, Lilian Ajio, Jesca Achan, Ruth Meeme, Betty Kizza, Racheal Nanyonga, Sylvia Nanyonga, Joan Nampungu, Stella Oyella, Stella Nanfuka, Muhayimina Namuwaya
