= Toh (surname) =

- Language: Chinese, Korean, others

Origin
- Region of origin: Singapore, Malaysia, South Korea, others

Other names
- Variant forms: Chinese: Du, Zhuo, Su; Korean: Do

Toh is a surname in various cultures.

== Origins ==
Toh may be:

- A spelling of the Hokkien pronunciation (Pe̍h-ōe-jī: Tō͘) of the Chinese surname spelled in Mandarin Pinyin as Dù (Chinese: 杜)
- A spelling of the Hokkien pronunciation (Pe̍h-ōe-jī: Toh) of the Chinese surname spelled in Mandarin Pinyin as Zhuó (Chinese: 卓)
- An alternative spelling of the Korean surname spelled in the Revised Romanisation of Korean as Do (Korean: 도).

== Statistics ==
Toh was the 17th-most common surname among ethnic Chinese in Singapore as of 1997 (ranked by English spelling, rather than by Chinese characters). Roughly 25,300 people, or 1.0% of the Chinese Singaporean population at the time, bore the surname Toh.

The 2010 United States census found 445 people with the surname Toh, making it the 47,614th-most-common name in the country, up from 279 (66,274th-most-common) in the 2000 Census. In both censuses, slightly more than three-quarters of the bearers of the surname identified as Asian American, and between 10% and 15% as African American.

== People ==
People with the surname Toh include:

=== Chinese surname 卓 ===
- Toh Ah Boon (卓亞文; 1860–1932), Singaporean landlord
- Toh Kian Chui (卓键水; 1927–2000), Singaporean construction industry businessman
- Patsy Toh (卓一龍; born 1940), Chinese pianist based in the United Kingdom
- Toh Guo'An (卓国安; born 1982), Singaporean footballer
- Toh Hong Huat (卓鸿发; born 1974; disappeared in 1986), Singaporean student who went missing at age 12

=== Chinese surname 杜 ===
- Toh Chin Chye (杜进才; 1921–2012), Singaporean politician
- Toh Aik Choon (杜亿春; 1927–1990), Singaporean shipbuilding industry businessman
- Sylvia Toh (杜碧珠; born 1946/1947), Singaporean newspaper columnist
- Toh Wei Soong (杜维崧; born 1998), Singaporean swimmer
- Toh Ee Wei (杜依蔚; born 2000), Malaysian badminton player

=== Other or unknown ===
People with another surname spelled Toh, or whose surnames as written in Chinese characters are not available:

- Somdej Toh (1788–1872), Thai Buddhist monk
- Boniface Hie Toh (born 1936), Ivorian boxer
- Kerstin Lindblad-Toh (born 1970), Swedish geneticist
- Terry Toh (born 1974), Singaporean chess master
- Toh Hsien Min (born 1975), Singaporean poet
- Peter Toh (born 1981), American musician
- Daryl Toh (born 1986), Malaysian comic book artist
- Joanna Toh (born 1996), Singaporean netball player
- Toh Kai Wei (born 1996), Singaporean netball player
- Nicholle Toh (born 2001), Singaporean swimmer
- Chai Keong Toh, Singaporean computer scientist
- Kim-Chuan Toh (fl. 1990–present), Singaporean mathematician
