= Du (surname) =

- The Du surname in regular script
- Pronunciation: Dù (Pinyin); Dou6 (Jyutping); Tō͘ (Pe̍h-ōe-jī)
- Language: Chinese, Vietnamese, Korean

Origin
- Language: Old Chinese
- Derivation: Qi (surname)
- Meaning: birchleaf pear

Other names
- Variant forms: Du, Tu (Mandarin); To, Tou (Cantonese); Toh, Taw (Hokkien); Đỗ (Vietnamese)
- Derivative: Đỗ
- See also: Fan

Du
- Du surname in regular script
- Pronunciation: Dū (Pinyin); To͘ (Pe̍h-ōe-jī)
- Language: Chinese, Vietnamese

Origin
- Language: Old Chinese
- Meaning: capital

Other names
- Variant forms: Du, Tu (Mandarin); Toh, Taw (Hokkien)

Du (Chinese: 杜; pinyin: Dù; Wade–Giles: Tu⁴) is a Chinese surname. The name is spelled Tu in Taiwan. In Hong Kong it is spelled as To and in Macao as Tou, based on the pronunciation of 杜 in Cantonese. In Singapore and Malaysia, it is spelled as Toh, based on the pronunciation of 杜 in Hokkien. The Vietnamese equivalent of the surname is Đỗ. However, when diacritics are dropped, it can also be from the Vietnamese surnames Dư 余 or Dũ 俞 (for both, the Chinese equivalent is Yu). It is the 129th surname in Hundred Family Surnames and is the 42nd most common surname in mainland China as of 2020.

== Origin and Branches of Du (杜) ==
The ancestors of the Du family are known as the Tangdu. The Tangdu resided southeast of Xi'an in Shaanxi province. The Fan (范) and Du clans share a common ancestor. Some members of the Du (杜) family are the Tuoba (拓跋) family of Emperor Xiaowen of Northern Wei. "Dugu" is the surname of Xianbei.

== Meanings of Du (杜) ==
- The Chinese name of Pyrus betulifolia, a deciduous tree of the genus pear in the rosaceae.
- A verb: to stop; to prevent; to restrict

== People with this name ==
=== Du ===
- Du Fu (杜甫) (712–770), Tang dynasty poet, considered one of China's greatest
- Du Fuwei (杜伏威) (d. 624), Sui dynasty military leader
- Du Hong (杜洪) (d. 905), late Tang dynasty warlord
- Du Ji (杜畿) (d. 224), Cao Wei official, grandfather of Du Yu
- Du Jin (杜堇) (ca. 1465–1509), Ming dynasty painter
- Du Mu (杜牧) (803–852), Tang dynasty poet
- Lady Du Qiu (杜秋娘) (fl. 807–831), Tang dynasty poet
- Du Rangneng (杜讓能) (841–893), late Tang dynasty military leader
- Du Ruhui (杜如晦) (585–630), Tang dynasty chancellor
- Du Shenquan (杜审权) (d. 870), jiedushi during the late Tang Dynasty
- Du Shi (杜詩) (d. 85), Han Dynasty mechanical engineer, credited with the invention of the water-powered blast furnace
- Du Wei (杜伟) (1962–2020), Chinese diplomat
- Du Yan (杜淹) (d. 628), Tang dynasty chancellor, uncle of Du Ruhui
- Du Yu (杜預) (222–285), Jin dynasty classicist, wrote an influential commentary to the Zuozhuan
- Du Yuchen (杜雨宸) (b. 2010), Chinese sports shooter
- Junping Du (杜军平), Chinese computer scientist
- Soon Ja Du, Korean-American shopkeeper convicted in the killing of Latasha Harlins
- Wang Yanqiu (fl. 900), official and general during the Five Dynasties & Ten Kingdoms who bore the adoptive name Du Yanqiu (杜晏球)

=== Duh, Taw, To, Toh, Tu ===
- Woody Duh (杜紫軍), Vice Premier of the Republic of China (2016)
- Taw Sein Ko (杜成誥/杜成浩), Burma's first archaeologist
- Alex To (杜德偉/杜德伟), a singer from Hong Kong
- Johnnie To (杜琪峯/杜琪峰), a film director from Hong Kong
- Chapman To, an actor from Hong Kong
- Tu Cheng-sheng, Taiwanese politician
- Loring W. Tu, Taiwanese-American mathematician
- Toh Chin Chye, (杜进才; 1921–2012), a prominent first generation political leader in Singapore
- Toh Aik Choon (杜亿春; 1927–1990), Singaporean shipbuilding industry businessman
- Sylvia Toh (杜白秋; born 1946/1947), Singaporean newspaper columnist
- Toh Wei Soong (杜维崧; born 1998), Singaporean swimmer
- Toh Ee Wei (杜依蔚; born 2000), Malaysian badminton player

== 都 ==
It was found to be the 330th most common surname, shared by 140,060 people or 0.011% of the population, with the province with the most being Shandong.

- Du Mu (Ming dynasty), (Chinese: 都穆; 1459–1525) was a Chinese poet, scholar and art critic from Suzhou
- Ray Du English (Chinese: 阿滴英文) is a Taiwanese educational YouTube channel hosted by 2 siblings, one of whom is internet personality Ray Du (都省瑞)

== See also ==
- Đỗ
