= Netball at the 2019 SEA Games =

- Venue: Santa Rosa Sports Complex
- Location: Santa Rosa, Laguna, Philippines
- Dates: 25 November – 2 December
- Competitors: 60 from 5 nations

Medalists
gold medal	Malaysia (MAS)
silver medal	Singapore (SGP)
bronze medal	Brunei (BRU)
bronze medal	Thailand (THA)

The netball competition at the 2019 Southeast Asian Games in the Philippines was held from 25 November to 2 December 2019 at Santa Rosa Sports Complex in Santa Rosa, Laguna.

== Competition schedule ==
The following is the competition schedule for the netball competitions:

P	Preliminaries	½	Semi-finals	F	Final

Mon 25	Tue 26	Wed 27	Thu 28	Fri 29	Sat 30	Sun 1	Mon 2
P	P	P	P	P		½	F

== Squads ==
Brunei (BRU)	Malaysia (MAS)	Philippines (PHI)	Singapore (SGP)	Thailand (THA)
Nurul Ajeerah Abdullah; Siti Marhayati Ahmad; Syafiqah Niqmatullah Amraan; Siti Nurul Nazihah bte. Awang Haji Hassan; Fadzilah Lubabul Bolkiah bte. Hassanal Bolkiah; Zuraidah Haji Abdul Amit; Nur Hafizah Haji Abdul Sidek; Nur Syuhaidah Fahriyana bte. Haji Sukri; Siti Norsaihah Mohammad Adi Najmi; Khalisha bte. Pengiran Abdul Rahman; Nurafiqah Samat; Nur Ady Elzza Ezrenna Sofian	An Najwa Azizan; Noor Azilah Aziz; Hasrin Nur Firra Syuhada; Izyan Syazana Mohd. Wazir; Karishma S. Loganathan; Khairunnisa Nazri; Noramirah Dayana Noor Azhar; Norashikin Kamal Zaman; Nur Syafazliyana Mohd Ali; Nurfariha Abdul Razak; Pow Mei Foong; Siti Nor Farhana Mustafa	Kristine Abriam; Ana Thea Cenarosa; Katryna Rose Domino; Diana Doqueza; Alexandrea Gastador; Jhianne Layug; Loraine Angela Lim; Karen Lomogda; Janelle Mendoza; Cathlyn Jane Seño; Zharmaine Velez; Eliezza Dianne Ventura	Nur Aqilah Andin; Carmen Goh; Shuyi Kwok; Pei Shan Lee; Vanessa Marie Lee; Angelina Lim Xue Ning; Jamie Lim Jia Yin; Sindhu Nair; Charmaine Soh Shi Hui; Xinyi Tan; Melody Teo; Kai Wei Toh	Nicha Aiemsuphan; Wanpansa Jitrahatchai; Paweena Kamwan; Khanittha Kangwonngan; Daraporn Panchang; Kliawked Panchutturat; Panita Rittirong; Sirima Samnaree; Viyada Sankam; Rungnapa Seetongbon; Pakladathanan Thiratananitiworachot; Bunwilai Thongma

== Results ==
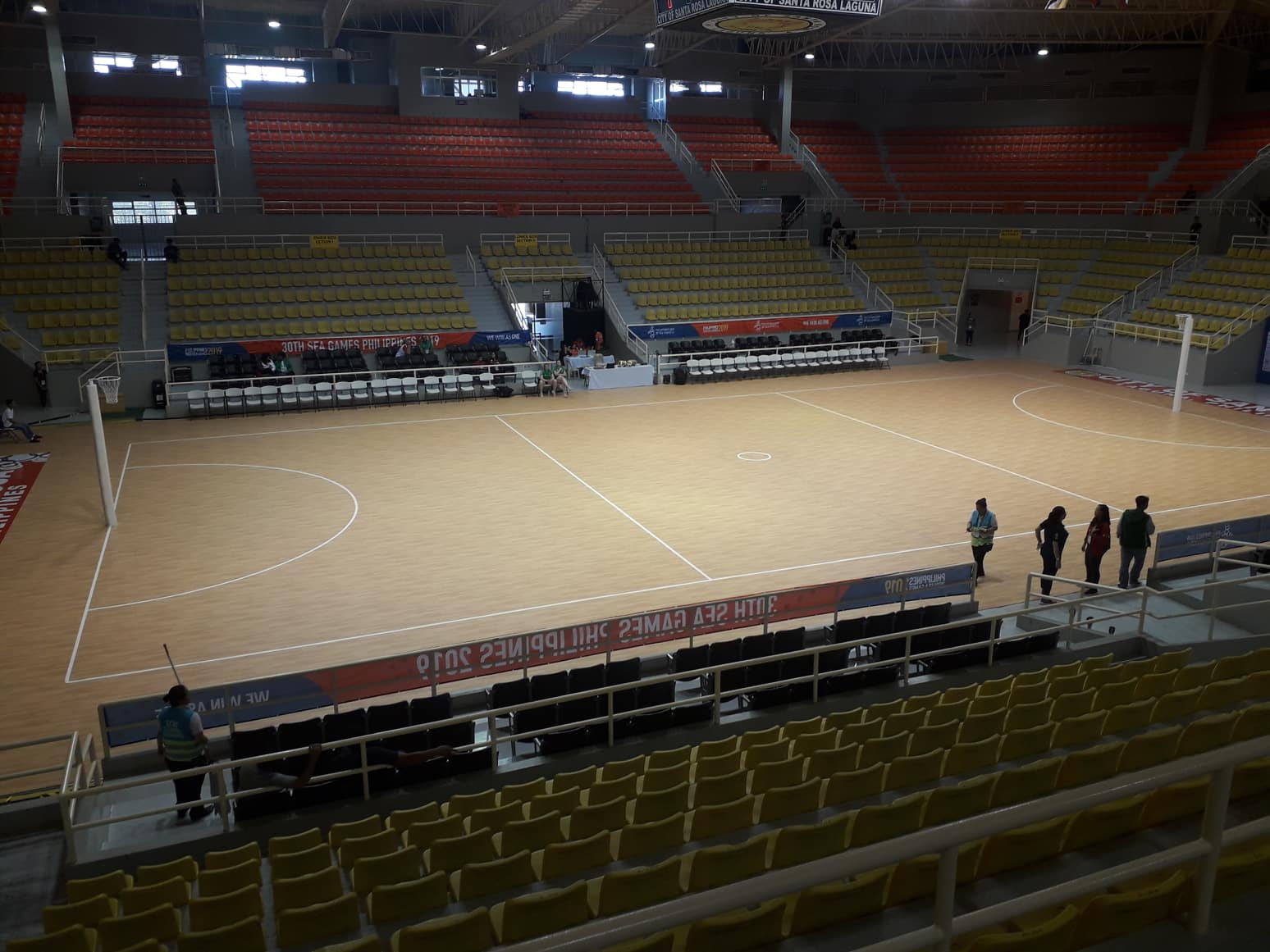
The Santa Rosa Sports Complex.

All times are Philippine Standard Time (UTC+08:00)

=== Preliminary round ===
Pos	Team	Pld	W	D	L	GF	GA	GD	Pts	
1	Malaysia	4	4	0	0	273	139	+134	8	Semi-finals
2	Singapore	4	3	0	1	251	156	+95	6	Semi-finals
3	Thailand	4	2	0	2	205	179	+26	4	Semi-finals
4	Brunei	4	1	0	3	142	238	−96	2	Semi-finals
5	Philippines (H)	4	0	0	4	126	285	−159	0	

Source: SEAGames PH 2019 Official Website
(H) Hosts

25 November 2019; 15:00	Report	Philippines	28–80	Singapore	Santa Rosa Sports Complex, Santa Rosa, Laguna
25 November 2019; 15:00	Report	Scoring by quarter: 6–21, 9–22, 5–21, 8–16			Santa Rosa Sports Complex, Santa Rosa, Laguna

25 November 2019; 17:00	Report	Thailand	42–62	Malaysia	Santa Rosa Sports Complex, Santa Rosa, Laguna
25 November 2019; 17:00	Report	Scoring by quarter: 7-17, 13-10, 11-16, 11-19			Santa Rosa Sports Complex, Santa Rosa, Laguna

26 November 2019; 15:00	Report	Thailand	63–28	Brunei	Santa Rosa Sports Complex, Santa Rosa, Laguna
26 November 2019; 15:00	Report	Scoring by quarter: 15–5, 16–9, 14–8, 18–6			Santa Rosa Sports Complex, Santa Rosa, Laguna

26 November 2019; 17:00	Report	Malaysia	88–25	Philippines	Santa Rosa Sports Complex, Santa Rosa, Laguna
26 November 2019; 17:00	Report	Scoring by quarter: 23–7, 21–8, 22–6, 22–4			Santa Rosa Sports Complex, Santa Rosa, Laguna

27 November 2019; 15:00	Report	Singapore	62–38	Brunei	Santa Rosa Sports Complex, Santa Rosa, Laguna
27 November 2019; 15:00	Report	Scoring by quarter: 8–9, 17–11, 18–8, 19–10			Santa Rosa Sports Complex, Santa Rosa, Laguna

27 November 2019; 17:00	Report	Philippines	29–64	Thailand	Santa Rosa Sports Complex, Santa Rosa, Laguna
27 November 2019; 17:00	Report	Scoring by quarter: 9–19, 5–14, 6–16, 9–15			Santa Rosa Sports Complex, Santa Rosa, Laguna

28 November 2019; 15:00	Report	Singapore	60–36	Thailand	Santa Rosa Sports Complex, Santa Rosa, Laguna
28 November 2019; 15:00	Report	Scoring by quarter: 11–11, 14–6, 17–11, 18–8			Santa Rosa Sports Complex, Santa Rosa, Laguna

28 November 2019; 17:00	Report	Brunei	23–69	Malaysia	Santa Rosa Sports Complex, Santa Rosa, Laguna
28 November 2019; 17:00	Report	Scoring by quarter: 5–17, 10–19, 3–17, 5–16			Santa Rosa Sports Complex, Santa Rosa, Laguna

29 November 2019; 15:00	Report	Brunei	53–44	Philippines	Santa Rosa Sports Complex, Santa Rosa, Laguna
29 November 2019; 15:00	Report	Scoring by quarter: 14–12, 12–13, 15–7, 12–12			Santa Rosa Sports Complex, Santa Rosa, Laguna

29 November 2019; 17:00	Report	Malaysia	54–49	Singapore	Santa Rosa Sports Complex, Santa Rosa, Laguna
29 November 2019; 17:00	Report	Scoring by quarter: 15–12, 13–12, 12–14, 14–11			Santa Rosa Sports Complex, Santa Rosa, Laguna

=== Final round ===
Semi-finals
1 December – 15:00
Malaysia	64
Brunei	40
1 December – 17:00
Singapore	61
Thailand	31

Gold medal match
2 December – 15:00
Malaysia	48
Singapore	42

==== Semi-finals ====
1 December 2019; 15:00	Report	Malaysia	64–40	Brunei	Santa Rosa Sports Complex, Santa Rosa, Laguna
1 December 2019; 15:00	Report	Scoring by quarter: 17–13, 16–8, 18–8, 13–11			Santa Rosa Sports Complex, Santa Rosa, Laguna

1 December 2019; 17:00	Report	Singapore	61–31	Thailand	Santa Rosa Sports Complex, Santa Rosa, Laguna
1 December 2019; 17:00	Report	Scoring by quarter: 17–6, 12–13, 16–5, 16–7			Santa Rosa Sports Complex, Santa Rosa, Laguna

=== Gold medal match ===
2 December 2019; 15:00	Report	Malaysia	48–42	Singapore	Santa Rosa Sports Complex, Santa Rosa, Laguna
2 December 2019; 15:00	Report	Scoring by quarter: 12–13, 9–8, 19–9, 8–12			Santa Rosa Sports Complex, Santa Rosa, Laguna

== Medal summary ==
=== Medalists ===
Event	Gold	Silver	Bronze
Women	Malaysia (MAS)	Singapore (SGP)	Brunei (BRU)
Women	Malaysia (MAS)	Singapore (SGP)	Thailand (THA)
