= 2019 Netball Singapore Nations Cup =

- Venues: OCBC Arena
- Location: Singapore
- Dates: 20–26 October
- Teams: Singapore; Namibia; Botswana; Cook Islands; Republic of Ireland; Papua New Guinea

Medalists
gold medal	Namibia
silver medal	Singapore

The 2019 Netball Singapore Nations Cup, also known as 2019 M1 Nations Cup, was the thirteenth edition of the Netball Singapore Nations Cup was held in OCBC Arena from 20–26 October 2019. The tournament featured six nations including hosts Singapore, defending champions Cook Islands along with Botswana, Ireland, Papua New Guinea and Namibia.

The opening match between Singapore and Namibia ended on a thrilling draw at 54–54. Namibia defeated hosts Singapore in the final 49–42 to win their first M1 Nations Cup title.

== Squads ==
Singapore
- Charmaine Soh (c)
- Kimberly Lim
- Aqilah Andin
- Melody Teo
- Kai Wei Toh
- Pei Shan Lee
- Sindhu Nair
- Kwok Shuyi
- Tan Xinyi
- Carmen Goh
- Angelina Lim
- Jamie Lim

Namibia
- Jatjinda Kambatuku
- Jaumbuaije Zauana
- Anna Kaspar
- Cathline Tjihero
- Leandri van der Walt
- Loide Hanyanya
- Anna Shiponga
- Imbeleni Omwa
- Emmy Katuko
- Venjekerera Maharero
- Vezembouua Mauano
- Mwale Kathy

=== Points Table ===
Team	P	W	D	L	For	Against	PTS
Namibia	5	4	1	0	280	226	9
Singapore	5	3	1	1	273	240	7
Botswana	5	3	0	2	255	230	6
Cook Islands	5	3	0	2	264	325	6
Republic of Ireland	5	1	0	4	175	232	2
Papua New Guinea	4	0	0	5	202	277	0

=== Pool stage ===
20 October 2019; 3:00pm	Singapore	54–54	Namibia	OCBC Arena

20 October 2019; 5:00pm	Republic of Ireland	41–38	Papua New Guinea	OCBC Arena

20 October 2019; 7:00pm	Botswana	47–54	Cook Islands	OCBC Arena

21 October 2019; 3:00pm	Republic of Ireland	31–52	Namibia	OCBC Arena

21 October 2019; 5:00pm	Cook Islands	62–34	Papua New Guinea	OCBC Arena

21 October 2019; 7:00pm	Singapore	52–57	Botswana	OCBC Arena

22 October 2019; 3:00pm	Papua New Guinea	36–58	Botswana	OCBC Arena

22 October 2019; 5:00pm	Namibia	61–47	Cook Islands	OCBC Arena

22 October 2019; 7:00pm	Singapore	51–35	Republic of Ireland	OCBC Arena

23 October 2019; 3:00pm	Papua New Guinea	47–59	Namibia	OCBC Arena

23 October 2019; 5:00pm	Republic of Ireland	34–46	Botswana	OCBC Arena

23 October 2019; 7:00pm	Singapore	59–47	Cook Islands	OCBC Arena

25 October 2019; 3:00pm	Namibia	54–37	Botswana	OCBC Arena

25 October 2019; 5:00pm	Republic of Ireland	34–45	Cook Islands	OCBC Arena

25 October 2019; 7:00pm	Singapore	57–47	Papua New Guinea	OCBC Arena

== 5th place playoff ==
26 October 2019; 12:00pm	Republic of Ireland	v	Papua New Guinea	OCBC Arena

== 3rd place playoff ==
26 October 2019; 2:00pm	Botswana	v	Cook Islands	OCBC Arena

== Final ==
26 October 2019; 4:00pm	Namibia	49–42	Singapore	OCBC Arena

== See also ==
- Netball in Singapore
