= 2019 Africa Netball Cup =

Tournament details
- Host country: South Africa
- City: Cape Town
- Venue: Bellville Velodrome
- Dates: 18–23 October 2019
- Teams: 6

Final positions
- Champions: South Africa
- Runners-up: Malawi
- Third place: Uganda

The 2019 Africa Netball Cup was held in Cape Town from 18-23 October 2019. The tournament featured seven nations including hosts South Africa, defending champions Uganda along with Kenya, Malawi, Zambia, Lesotho and Zimbabwe in 2 pool categories. Tanzania pulled out of the tournament due to financial issues, just a day before the tournament opener against Zimbabwe. The tournament was originally supposed to have its scheduled opening match between defending champions Uganda and Zimbabwe but was called off due to the last minute withdrawal by Tanzania. The authorities later revealed that the match between hosts South Africa and Zimbabwe to be the opening match of the tournament while the tournament was later modified with round robin format.

South Africa defeated Zambia 72-53 to win the tournament with a perfect 100 percentage winning record.

== Squads ==
Malawi and Uganda announced their preliminary squads in September 2019. Malawi revealed a list of 24 players in the squad and later cropped the list to 12 members. Malawi's national captain Joanna Kachilika and Thandie Galleta were rested for the tournament who were earlier named in the preliminary squad while Caroline Mtukule was appointed as stand in captain for Malawi. Uganda released a squad consisting of 22 players. In September 2019, just three weeks prior to the start of the tournament, Ugandan captain Peace Proscovia was ruled out of the tournament due to a knee injury which she sustained while playing at the Australian league. In October 2019, Dorette Badenhorst was appointed as the new head coach for South Africa following the exit of Norma Plummer.

Just a day prior to the tournament opener, Zimbabwean head coach Lloyd Makunde was sacked due to pay disputes.

Malawi	Uganda	Zimbabwe	South Africa
Caroline Mtukule (c); Joyce Mvula; Sindi Simtowe; Jane Chimaliro; Jessica Sanudi; Lauren Ngwira; Towera Vinkhumbo; Grace Mwafulirwa (vc); Martha Dambo; Bridget Kumwenda; Takondwa Lwazi; Sindi Simtowe-Msowoya	~~Peace Proscovia~~; Mary Nuba; Inene Eyaru; Shafie Nalwanja; Fauzia Nakibuule; Norah Lunkuse; Stella Oyella; Racheal Nanyonga; Martha Soigi; Joan Nampungu; Betty Namukasa; Privas Kaye; Brenda Namubiru; Betty Kiiza; Ruth Meeme; Tausi Mumena; Jesca Achan; Stella Nanfuka; Nusurah Sebi; Enid Abalo; Hindu Namutebi; Desire Mirembe	Felisitus Kwangwa (c); Sharleen Makusha; Ursula Ndlovu; Sharon Bwanali; Queen Sigauke; Linda Nkorongo; Joyce Takaidza; Patricia Mauladi; Beverly Chipadza; Progress Moyo; Claris Kwaramba; Takenda Dziva; Lorraine Manjaro	Bongiwe Msomi (c); Sigrid Burger; Khanyisa Chawane; Rome Dreyer; Precious Mthembu; Izette Griesel; Lenize Potgieter; Lefebre Rademan; Monique Reynecke; Renske Stoltz; Zanele Vimbela; Shadine van der Merwe

=== Pool stage ===
18 October 2019; 10:00am	South Africa	106–10	Lesotho	Bellville Velodrome, Cape Town

18 October 2019; 12:00pm	South Africa	56–51	Malawi	Bellville Velodrome, Cape Town

19 October 2019; 12:00pm	Uganda	67–33	Zambia	Bellville Velodrome, Cape Town

22 October 2019; 18:00pm	South Africa	50–47	Uganda	Bellville Velodrome, Cape Town

22 October 2019; 10:00am	Zimbabwe	68–35	Kenya	Bellville Velodrome, Cape Town

22 October 2019; 12:00pm	Lesotho	22–79	Zimbabwe	Bellville Velodrome, Cape Town

22 October 2019; 14:00pm	Uganda	67–33	Zambia	Bellville Velodrome, Cape Town

23 October 2019; 16:00pm	South Africa	72–53	Zambia	Bellville Velodrome, Cape Town
