= Muskwe =

Muskwe is a Zimbabwean surname. Notable people with this surname include:

- Adelaide Muskwe (born 1998), Zimbabwean netball player
- Admiral Muskwe (born 1998), Zimbabwean football forward
