= Netball in Zimbabwe =

- Country: Zimbabwe
- National team: Zimbabwe

Netball in Zimbabwe is viewed as a feminine sport and it is particularly popular in Zimbabwe. The country has few netball facilities, as soccer is much more popular in the country. At the same time, women's sports like netball get less government support because they are sports for women.

Netball is one of several sports that have replaced traditional games in the region as the country began to globalize. Some women played netball when they were younger. The Orphans and Vulnerable Children Project is involved in participating in netball games in the country.

In 1956, an English team toured the Southern Rhodesia. It was their first touring side and all team members had to pay their own airfare.

The country has a national netball team.
