= Nanfuka =

Nanfuka is a surname. Notable people with the surname include:

- Rehema Nanfuka (born 1986), Ugandan film, theatre and television actress, director, and filmmaker
- Stella Nanfuka (born 1997), Ugandan netball player
