= 2022 Rizal Golden Coolers season =

Third season of the franchise in the MPBL

- Arena(s): Ynares Center

Results
- Record: 10–11 (.476)
- Place: Division: 6th (South)
- Playoff finish: Division Semifinals (lost vs. Batangas City, 1–2)

Rizal Golden Coolers seasons

The 2022 Rizal Golden Coolers season was the third season of the franchise in the Maharlika Pilipinas Basketball League (MPBL).

Returning to the South Division, Rizal made a splash by soaring to a 10–5 record in their first fifteen games, a far cry from their previous two seasons, where they were had the worst record of the division. Despite that, they would fall in their last six games to finish the regular season 10–11, one game below .500. It is still enough for the Golden Coolers to clinch the sixth seed in the South Division.

Rizal was matched against third-seeded Sarangani, who are six games ahead, but it did not make any difference as the Golden Coolers stunned the Marlins in a Division Quarterfinals sweep. They would, however, be swept by the Batangas City Embassy Chill in the Division Semifinals.

The team played both of their home games this season at Ynares Center in Antipolo.

== Preseason ==
Rizal was one of 22 teams that took part in the 2021 MPBL Invitational, competing as Rizal Emkai Xentromall. They would fail to make the playoffs after finishing in fifth place in Group D.

=== Schedule ===
2021 Rizal Emkai Xentromall Invitational schedule
Stage	Game	Date	Opponent	Score	Location	Record	Recap
Group stage	1	December 12	General Santos	W 73–66	SM Mall of Asia Arena	1–0	
Group stage	2	December 13	Manila	L 59–89	SM Mall of Asia Arena	1–1	
Group stage	3	December 16	Bulacan	L 79–87	SM Mall of Asia Arena	1–2	
Group stage	4	December 18	Mindoro	L 83–86	SM Mall of Asia Arena	1–3	
Group stage	5	December 20	Imus	L 79–90	SM Mall of Asia Arena	1–4	
Source: Schedule

== Regular season ==
=== Standings ===
Pos	Team	Pld	W	L	GB	Qualification
4	GenSan Warriors	21	15	6	3	Playoffs
5	Bacolod Bingo Plus	21	14	7	4	Playoffs
6	Rizal Golden Coolers	21	10	11	8	Playoffs
7	Bacoor City Strikers	21	9	12	9	Playoffs
8	Muntinlupa Cagers	21	6	15	12	Playoffs

Source: Standings
Rules for classification: 1) Wins; 2a) If two teams are tied, head-to-head match-up; 2b) If three or more teams are tied, head-to-head point quotient; 3) overall point quotient; 4) coin toss.

=== Schedule ===
2022 Rizal Golden Coolers season schedule
Game	Date	Opponent	Score	Location	Record	Recap
1	May 21	Sarangani		Ynares Center	0–1	
2	June 7	General Santos		Caloocan Sports Complex	0–2	
3	June 11	Pampanga		Batangas City Coliseum	1–2	
4	June 21	Manila		Orion Sports Complex	2–2	
5	June 27	Bacoor City		Ynares Center	3–2	
6	July 9	Pasig City		Orion Sports Complex	3–3	
7	July 15	Laguna		Caloocan Sports Complex	4–3	
8	July 23	Mindoro		Ynares Sports Arena	5–3	
9	July 29	Muntinlupa		Laguna Sports Complex	6–3	
10	August 8	Quezon City		Nueva Ecija Coliseum	7–3	
11	August 12	Caloocan		San Jose del Monte Sports Complex	7–4	
12	August 20	Bacolod		Bren Z. Guiao Convention Center	8–4	
13	August 23	Makati		Batangas City Coliseum	9–4	
14	August 29	Nueva Ecija		Santa Rosa Sports Complex	9–5	
15	September 3	Valenzuela		Ynares Sports Arena	10–5	
16	September 12	Batangas City		Bren Z. Guiao Convention Center	10–6	
17	September 15	Zamboanga		Ynares Sports Arena	10–7	
18	September 17	Bataan		Strike Gymnasium	10–8	
19	September 23	Imus City		Nueva Ecija Coliseum	10–9	
20	September 29	San Juan		Batangas City Coliseum	10–10	
21	October 11	Marikina		Bren Z. Guiao Convention Center	10–11	
Source: Schedule

== Playoffs ==
=== Schedule ===
2022 Rizal Golden Coolers playoff schedule
Round	Game	Date	Opponent	Score	Location	Series	Recap
Division Quarterfinals	1	October 21	Sarangani		Batangas City Coliseum	1–0	Recap
Division Quarterfinals	2	October 28	Sarangani		Ynares Sports Arena	2–0	Recap
Division Semifinals	1	November 8	Batangas City		Mayor Vitaliano D. Agan Coliseum	0–1	Recap
Division Semifinals	2	November 12	Batangas City		Batangas City Coliseum	0–2	Recap
Source: Schedule
