= Aliti (name) =

Aliti is both a given name and surname. People with the name include:

- Ardit Aliti (born 1996), Albanian-Danish musician
- Aliti Namoce (born 1997), Fijian rugby league footballer
- Aliti Toribau (born 2001), Fijian netball player
- Fidan Aliti (born 1993), footballer
