= Tak (surname) =

- Language: Dutch, Middle English, Old French, Korean, Bagri, Punjabi, Hindi, Marwari, Gujarati

Other names
- Variant forms: Indian: Tak, Taak, Taunk; Korean : Tag, Taek, Tark

Tak is a Dutch, English, Indian, and Korean surname.

== Origins ==
The Dutch surname Tak originated both from the Dutch-language word tak "tree branch", and as a diminutive of the Germanic given name Theuderic.

The Indian surname Tak/Taak belongs to gotra/clan of Hindu Bagri Kumhars (Khapmaru). It is said that they were descents of Raja Sain Pal, a Rajput ruler. Tak/Taunk is also name of a Rajput clan of India.

As an English surname, Tak is a historical spelling of Tagg, which originated in a variety of ways, including as a diminutive of various Germanic names starting with Dag- (e.g. Dagobert), and as a nickname possibly from Middle English tagge "tatter" (referring to a person wearing tattered clothes) or from Old French tache "belt buckle". One early record of a person with a surname spelled Tak is Hugo Tak of Rushden, Northamptonshire, in the Poll Tax of 1379.

The Korean surname spelled Tak (Korean: 탁) in the Revised Romanization of Korean is written with the hanja nopeul tak (높을 탁; 卓), meaning "lofty" or "outstanding". The same character is used to write the Chinese surname now pronounced Zhuó in Mandarin Chinese. The major bon-gwan (clan hometown) for people with this surname is Gwangsan, Gwangju. See Gwangsan Tak clan.

== Statistics ==
In the Netherlands, there were 1,579 people with the surname Tak in 2007, up from 1,203 in 1947. The largest numbers of bearers of the surname were found two municipalities in North Brabant in the Southern Netherlands: Halderberge (191 people) and Roosendaal (139 people).

The 2000 South Korean census recorded 19,395 people in 6,023 households with the surname spelled Tak in the Revised Romanization of Korean. Of these, 17,322 people in 5,381 households identified their clan's bon-gwan as Gwangsan or Gwangju, and 1,368 people in 433 households as Gapyeong, while the remaining 705 people in 209 households identified other places as their bon-gwan or did not state their bon-gwan. Bearers of this surname usually but not always choose to spell it as Tak in the Latin alphabet. In a study by the National Institute of the Korean Language based on year 2007 application data for South Korean passports, it was found that 73.6% of people with that surname spelled it in Latin letters as Tak in their passports. Rarer alternative spellings included Tag, Taek, and Tark.

The 2010 United States census found 854 people with the surname Tak, making it the 28,856th-most-common surname in the country. This represented an increase from 653 people (33,054th-most-common) in the 2000 census. In both censuses, more than eight-tenths of bearers of the surname identified as Asian, and about one-tenth as non-Hispanic white.

== People ==
- Ad Tak (born 1953), Dutch cyclist
- Ashk Ali Tak (born 1956), Indian politician, member of the Rajya Sabha representing Rajasthan
- Bibi Dumon Tak (born 1964), Dutch writer of children's literature
- Mahinder Tak (fl. 2008), American radiation oncologist and retired US Army colonel of Indian descent
- Meng Heang Tak (fl. 2018–present), Cambodian-born Australian politician
- Paul-Peter Tak (fl. 1990s–present), Dutch immunologist
- Pieter Lodewijk Tak (1848–1907), Dutch journalist and politician
- Saawan Kumar Tak (born 1936), Indian film director
- Suresh Tak (born 1962), Indian politician, member of the Rajasthan Legislative Assembly

=== Korean ===
- Tak In-suk (born 1949), North Korean speed skater
- Tak Jae-hoon (탁재훈; 卓在勳), stage name of Bae Sung-woo (born 1968), South Korean singer
- Tak Jae-in (탁재인; 卓在仁; fl. 1980s), South Korean voice actor
- Tak Jung-im (탁정임; 卓貞任; born 1967), South Korean fencer
- Tak Young-jun (탁영준; 卓榮俊; born 1978), South Korean business executive

== See also ==
- Seomoon Tak (서문탁; born 1978), South Korean singer; here the Korean surname is Seomoon/Seomun, 서문
