= Zhuo =

Zhuo (卓)
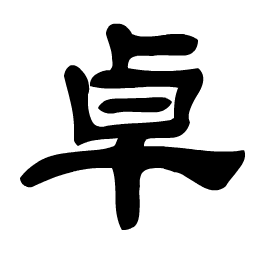
- The Zhuo surname in regular script
- Pronunciation: Zhuó (Mandarin Pinyin); Zhuō (former Mandarin pronunciation); Coek3 (Cantonese Jyutping); Toh (Hokkien Pe̍h-ōe-jī)
- Language: Chinese

Origin
- Language: Old Chinese
- Meaning: outstanding, eminent

Zhuo ([ʈʂwǒ]; Chinese: 卓) 224th most common surname in China, shared by 360,000 people (2008). In the Wade–Giles system of romanization, it is romanized as Cho, which is commonly used in Taiwan. The surname is listed 277th in the Song dynasty classic text Hundred Family Surnames.

== Transliterations and Derivatives ==
- Zhuo in Mandarin, alternatively romanized as Cho or Jo in Taiwan.
- Coek, Cheuk, Cherk or Chak in Cantonese
- Doh, Toh or Tok in Hokkien and Teochew
- Chok in Hakka
- Doh in Eastern Min
- Cheok in Macau
- Chuk, Chok, Chock, or Toh in Malaysia
- Tjoek, Toq or Toh in Indonesia
- Toh, Cher, Cho, Chok, Tho, Tock, or Tok in Singapore

=== Derivatives ===
- As the Hanja of the Korean surname romanized as Tak (Korean: 탁; Hanja: 卓)
- As the Chữ Nôm for the Vietnamese surname Trác

== Notable people ==
- Zhuo Wenjun (2nd century BC), celebrated poet, wife of Sima Xiangru
- Zhuo Mao (卓茂; c. 50 BC – AD 28), Han dynasty Grand Tutor and Marquis of Baode (褒德侯)
- Zhuo Jing (卓敬; died 1402), Ming dynasty minister, executed for refusing to serve the Yongle Emperor
- Zhuo Bingtian (卓秉恬; 1782–1855), Qing dynasty Minister of Defense
- Toh Ah Boon or Zhuo Yawen (1860–1932), Malayan businessman
- Zhuo Lin (1916–2009), wife of Deng Xiaoping
- Toh Kian Chui (卓键水) (1927–2000), Singaporean philanthropist
- Zhuo Renxi (1931–2019), chemist, academician of the Chinese Academy of Sciences
- Alfred Y. Cho or Zhuo Yihe (born 1937), Chinese-American electrical engineer
- Patsy Toh or Zhuo Yilong (born 1940), pianist, Fellow of the Royal Academy of Music
- Zhuo Changren (卓长仁; 1948–2001), Chinese aircraft hijacker and murderer in Taiwan
- Cho Sheng-li (卓勝利; 1949–2012), Taiwanese actor
- H. T. Cho or Zhuo Huotu (卓火土; born 1950), cofounder and former CEO of HTC
- Zhuo Xinping (卓新平; born 1955), scholar of religions, academician of Chinese Academy of Social Sciences
- Cho Jung-tai (born 1959), Taiwanese politician, Chairman-elect of the Democratic Progressive Party
- Cheuk Wan-chi or Zhuo Yunzhi (born 1979), Hong Kong media personality
- Timi Zhuo or Zhuo Yi-ting (born 1981), Taiwanese singer
- Toh Guo'An or Zhuo Guo'an (born 1982), Singaporean football player
- Genie Chuo or Zhuo Wenxuan (born 1986), Taiwanese singer
- Murder of the Zhuo family, a Chinese-American family who were murdered by a cousin in 2013
- Toh Hong Huat (卓鸿发; born 1974, disappeared in 1986), a twelve-year-old schoolboy who went missing in Singapore
