= 2022 Nueva Ecija Rice Vanguards season =

Second season of the franchise in the MPBL

- MPBL champions
- Division champions
- Head coach: Jerson Cabiltes
- Arena(s): Nueva Ecija Coliseum

Results
- Record: 21–0 (1.000)
- Place: Division: 1st (North)
- Playoff finish: MPBL champions (won vs. Zamboanga, 3–1)

Nueva Ecija Rice Vanguards seasons

The 2022 Nueva Ecija Rice Vanguards season was the second season of the franchise in the Maharlika Pilipinas Basketball League (MPBL).

The Rice Vanguards sought to improve from their previous 10–20 campaign. On July 5, they would play in their inaugural home game, in which they would equalize their previous season's record in win percentage. They would then surpass that with their eighth win on July 12. Showing dominance across the board, the 2022 Nueva Ecija Rice Vanguards became the first team in league history to achieve a regular season sweep. This came following their 21st win against the Batangas City Embassy Chill at home on October 7.

Nueva Ecija began their playoff campaign with sweeps against Marikina and Pampanga before facing the San Juan Knights in the North Division finals. In game 1, San Juan dealt Nueva Ecija their first loss of the entire season before the Rice Vanguards would then win the next two games to advance to the 2022 national finals against the Zamboanga Family's Brand Sardines. After winning the first two games, the team would lose game 3, but eventually seal the championship with a game 4 victory.

The team played all of their home games at Nueva Ecija Coliseum in Palayan.

== Preseason ==
Nueva Ecija was one of 22 teams that took part in the 2021 MPBL Invitational. They would reach the finals against the Basilan Jumbo Plastic, who they would lose to in overtime.

=== Schedule ===
2021 Nueva Ecija Rice Vanguards Invitational schedule
Stage	Game	Date	Opponent	Score	Location	Record	Recap
Group stage	1	December 12	Sarangani	W 99–92	SM Mall of Asia Arena	1–0	
Group stage	2	December 16	Valenzuela	W 100–77	SM Mall of Asia Arena	2–0	
Group stage	3	December 19	San Juan	W 88–85	SM Mall of Asia Arena	3–0	
Group stage	4	December 20	Muntinlupa	W 84–72	SM Mall of Asia Arena	4–0	
Playoffs	QF	December 21	Iloilo	W 84–67	SM Mall of Asia Arena	5–0	
Playoffs	SF	December 22	Imus City	W 82–76	SM Mall of Asia Arena	6–0	
Playoffs	F	December 23	Basilan	L 80–83	SM Mall of Asia Arena	6–1	
Source: Schedule

== Regular season ==
=== Standings ===
Pos	Team	Pld	W	L	GB	Qualification
1	Nueva Ecija Rice Vanguards	21	21	0	—	Playoffs
2	Pasig City MCW Sports	21	14 (Note: Pasig (1.193), San Juan (0.993), and Pampanga (0.850) are ranked based on head-to-head point quotient.)	7	7	Playoffs
3	San Juan Knights	21	14	7	7	Playoffs
4	Pampanga Giant Lanterns	21	14	7	7	Playoffs
5	Bataan Risers	21	13	8	8	Playoffs

Source: Standings
Rules for classification: 1) Wins; 2a) If two teams are tied, head-to-head match-up; 2b) If three or more teams are tied, head-to-head point quotient; 3) overall point quotient; 4) coin toss.

=== Schedule ===
2022 Nueva Ecija Rice Vanguards season schedule
Game	Date	Opponent	Score	Location	Record	Recap
1	May 23	Mindoro	W 98–68	Bahayang Pag-asa Sports Complex	1–0	
2	June 4	General Santos	W 95–83	San Andres Sports Complex	2–0	
3	June 7	Makati	W 84–43	Caloocan Sports Complex	3–0	
4	June 13	Imus City	W 107–81	Batangas City Coliseum	4–0	
5	June 18	Quezon City	W 93–77	Caloocan Sports Complex	5–0	
6	July 2	Sarangani	W 87–79	Orion Sports Complex	6–0	
7	July 5	Laguna	W 109–79	Nueva Ecija Coliseum	7–0	
8	July 12	San Juan	W 81–75	Nueva Ecija Coliseum	8–0	
9	July 18	Bacolod	W 81–74	La Salle Coliseum	9–0	
10	July 19	Valenzuela	W 68–61	La Salle Coliseum	10–0	
11	July 26	Bacoor City	W 87–76	Paco Arena	11–0	
12	July 30	Bataan	W 79–65	Caloocan Sports Complex	12–0	
13	August 8	Zamboanga	W 81–76	Nueva Ecija Coliseum	13–0	
14	August 15	Marikina	W 99–77	Bren Z. Guiao Convention Center	14–0	
15	August 23	Muntinlupa	W 102–85	Batangas City Coliseum	15–0	
16	August 29	Rizal	W 83–64	Santa Rosa Sports Complex	16–0	
17	September 13	Manila	W 85–58	Nueva Ecija Coliseum	17–0	
18	September 19	Caloocan	W 103–86	Caloocan Sports Complex	18–0	
19	September 23	Pampanga	W 80–74	Nueva Ecija Coliseum	19–0	
20	September 28	Pasig City	W 77–66	Laguna Sports Complex	20–0	
21	October 7	Batangas City	W 84–72	Nueva Ecija Coliseum	21–0	
Source: Schedule

== Playoffs ==
=== Schedule ===
2022 Nueva Ecija Rice Vanguards playoff schedule
Round	Game	Date	Opponent	Score	Location	Series	Recap
Division quarterfinals	1	October 15	Marikina	W 103–71	Nueva Ecija Coliseum	1–0	Recap
Division quarterfinals	2	October 22	Marikina	W 82–71	Bren Z. Guiao Convention Center	2–0	Recap
Division semifinals	1	November 7	Pampanga	W 104–89	Nueva Ecija Coliseum	1–0	Recap
Division semifinals	2	November 11	Pampanga	W 89–84	Filoil EcoOil Centre	2–0	Recap
Division finals	1	November 18	San Juan	L 72–79	Nueva Ecija Coliseum	0–1	Recap
Division finals	2	November 21	San Juan	W 89–83	Filoil EcoOil Centre	1–1	Recap
Division finals	3	November 25	San Juan	W 84–68	Nueva Ecija Coliseum	2–1	Recap
National finals	1	December 2	Zamboanga	W 81–75	Nueva Ecija Coliseum	1–0	Recap
National finals	2	December 5	Zamboanga	W 75–74	Nueva Ecija Coliseum	2–0	Recap
National finals	3	December 9	Zamboanga	L 65–75	Mayor Vitaliano D. Agan Coliseum	2–1	Recap
National finals	4	December 12	Zamboanga	W 69–56	Mayor Vitaliano D. Agan Coliseum	3–1	Recap
Source: Schedule
