= Toh =

Toh, TOH, or ToH may refer to:

- Tarso Toh, a volcano field in Chad
- This Old House, an American home improvement magazine and television series
- Tonga language (Mozambique) (ISO-639: toh)
- Top-of-hour (TOH) station identification, a legal requirement for radio stations
- Tower of Hanoi, a mathematical game or puzzle
- Treehouse of Horror (series), The Simpsons Halloween specials
  - "Treehouse of Horror", the third episode in The Simpsons' second season
- Trondheim Business School (Norwegian: Trondheim Økonomiske Høgskolee, TØH)
- The Owl House, an American animated television series
- Tower of Hell, a Roblox game

== People ==
- Toh (surname), a surname in Chinese, Korean, and other cultures
- Toh EnJoe (born 1972), Japanese author
- Toh Yah (1917–1952), Navajo painter
