= 2022 Zamboanga Family's Brand Sardines season =

Third season of the franchise in the MPBL

- Division champions
- Head coach: Vic Ycasiano
- Arena(s): Mayor Vitaliano D. Agan Coliseum

Results
- Record: 18–3 (.857)
- Place: Division: 1st (South)
- Playoff finish: National finals (lost vs. Nueva Ecija, 1–3)

Zamboanga Family's Brand Sardines seasons

The 2022 Zamboanga Family's Brand Sardines season was the third season of the franchise in the Maharlika Pilipinas Basketball League (MPBL).

After reaching the division semifinals in their previous campaign, Zamboanga opened their 2022 season with an eight-game winning streak. This would be followed by a stretch of three consecutive losses, which would become the only losses of their entire regular season run. The Family's Brand Sardines then finished with a ten-game winning streak to cap off with an 18–3 record and the top seed in the South Division.

After sweeping Muntinlupa and then defeating Bacolod in a three-game series, Zamboanga faced against the Batangas City Embassy Chill for the third consecutive season. Despite losing game 1 at home, Zamboanga would then win the next two games, with a close win in game 3 clinching their spot in the 2022 national finals against the Nueva Ecija Rice Vanguards. Down 0–2, Zamboanga came home to win game 3 of the series, but would ultimately lose game 4, ending their chances at a championship.

The team played all of their home games this season at the Mayor Vitaliano D. Agan Coliseum in Zamboanga City.

== Regular season ==
=== Standings ===
Pos	Team	Pld	W	L	GB	Qualification
1	Zamboanga Family's Brand Sardines	21	18	3	—	Playoffs
2	Batangas City Embassy Chill	21	17	4	1	Playoffs
3	Sarangani Marlins	21	16	5	2	Playoffs
4	GenSan Warriors	21	15	6	3	Playoffs
5	Bacolod Bingo Plus	21	14	7	4	Playoffs

Source: Standings
Rules for classification: 1) Wins; 2a) If two teams are tied, head-to-head match-up; 2b) If three or more teams are tied, head-to-head point quotient; 3) overall point quotient; 4) coin toss.

=== Schedule ===
2022 Zamboanga Family's Brand Sardines season schedule
Game	Date	Opponent	Score	Location	Record	Recap
1	May 21	Caloocan		Ynares Center	1–0	
2	May 24	Makati		Bren Z. Guiao Convention Center	2–0	
3	June 6	San Juan		Filoil Flying V Centre	3–0	
4	June 20	Marikina		Santa Rosa Sports Complex	4–0	
5	June 25	Pasig City		Alonte Sports Arena	5–0	
6	July 11	Sarangani		Bren Z. Guiao Convention Center	6–0	
7	July 18	Valenzuela		La Salle Coliseum	7–0	
8	July 19	Bacolod		La Salle Coliseum	8–0	
9	July 26	Manila		Paco Arena	8–1	
10	August 1	Batangas City		Batangas City Coliseum	8–2	
11	August 8	Nueva Ecija		Nueva Ecija Coliseum	8–3	
12	August 16	Bataan		Filoil EcoOil Centre	9–3	
13	August 22	Laguna		San Andres Sports Complex	10–3	
14	August 29	Muntinlupa		Santa Rosa Sports Complex	11–3	
15	September 3	Bacoor City		Ynares Sports Arena	12–3	
16	September 15	Rizal		Ynares Sports Arena	13–3	
17	September 20	General Santos		Mayor Vitaliano D. Agan Coliseum	14–3	
18	September 28	Quezon City		Laguna Sports Complex	15–3	
19	October 4	Mindoro		Muntinlupa Sports Center	16–3	
20	October 6	Pampanga		Orion Sports Complex	17–3	
21	October 11	Imus City		Bren Z. Guiao Convention Center	18–3	
Source: Schedule

== Playoffs ==
=== Schedule ===
2022 Zamboanga Family's Brand Sardines playoff schedule
Round	Game	Date	Opponent	Score	Location	Series	Recap
Division quarterfinals	1	October 17	Muntinlupa		Mayor Vitaliano D. Agan Coliseum		Recap
Division quarterfinals	2	October 24	Muntinlupa		Batangas City Coliseum		Recap
Division semifinals	1	November 8	Bacolod		Mayor Vitaliano D. Agan Coliseum		Recap
Division semifinals	2	November 12	Bacolod		Batangas City Coliseum		Recap
Division semifinals	3	November 15	Bacolod		Mayor Vitaliano D. Agan Coliseum		Recap
Division finals	1	November 19	Batangas City		Mayor Vitaliano D. Agan Coliseum		Recap
Division finals	2	November 22	Batangas City		Batangas City Coliseum		Recap
Division finals	3	November 26	Batangas City		Mayor Vitaliano D. Agan Coliseum		Recap
National finals	1	December 2	Nueva Ecija		Nueva Ecija Coliseum		Recap
National finals	2	December 5	Nueva Ecija		Nueva Ecija Coliseum		Recap
National finals	3	December 9	Nueva Ecija		Mayor Vitaliano D. Agan Coliseum		Recap
National finals	4	December 12	Nueva Ecija		Mayor Vitaliano D. Agan Coliseum		Recap
Source: Schedule
