= Felisitus Kwangwa =

Zimbabwean netball player (born 1995)

Personal information
- Born: 9 March 1995 (age 30); Njube, Bulawayo, Zimbabwe
- Height: 1.73 m (5 ft 8 in)
- Occupation: netball player

Netball career
- Playing position(s): goal defense

Felisitus Kwangwa also spelled as Felistus Kwangwa (born 9 March 1995) is a Zimbabwean netball player and current captain of the Zimbabwe national team who plays in the position of goal defense. Kwangwa plies her trade in the United Kingdom for Vitality Netball Superleague club Surrey Storm. She was a member of the Zimbabwean squad which finished eighth during the 2019 Netball World Cup, which was historically Zimbabwe's first ever appearance at a Netball World Cup tournament. She also served as the vice captain of the team during the 2019 Netball World Cup.

In September 2019, She was appointed as the captain of the national team after the retirement of former skipper Perpetua Siyachitema and captained the Zimbabwe Gems squad at the 2019 African Netball Championships.
