= 2022 Sarangani Marlins season =

Second season of the franchise in the MPBL

- Arena(s): Sarangani Capitol Gymnasium

Results
- Record: 16–5 (.762)
- Place: Division: 3rd (South)
- Playoff finish: Division quarterfinals (lost vs. Rizal, 0–2)

Sarangani Marlins seasons

The 2022 Sarangani Marlins season was the second season of the franchise in the Maharlika Pilipinas Basketball League (MPBL).

The Marlins came off a controversial inaugural season that saw the team temporarily suspended due to game-fixing allegations. Now with Kyt Jimenez leading the team, Sarangani was able to turn things around by finishing the season third place in the South Division. Their playoff run came to an abrupt end after getting swept by the sixth-seeded Rizal Golden Coolers in the division quarterfinals.

== Preseason ==
Sarangani was one of 22 teams that competed in the 2021 MPBL Invitational. The team failed to make the playoffs after placing fourth in Group C.

=== Schedule ===
2021 Sarangani Marlins Invitational schedule
Stage	Game	Date	Opponent	Score	Location	Record	Recap
Group stage	1	December 12	Nueva Ecija	L 92–99	SM Mall of Asia Arena	1–0	
Group stage	2	December 13	San Juan	L 72–91	SM Mall of Asia Arena	2–0	
Group stage	3	December 15	Muntinlupa	W 75–66	SM Mall of Asia Arena	2–1	
Group stage	4	December 18	Valenzuela	L 73–77	SM Mall of Asia Arena	3–1	
Source: Schedule

== Regular season ==
=== Standings ===
Pos	Team	Pld	W	L	GB	Qualification
1	Zamboanga Family's Brand Sardines	21	18	3	—	Playoffs
2	Batangas City Embassy Chill	21	17	4	1	Playoffs
3	Sarangani Marlins	21	16	5	2	Playoffs
4	GenSan Warriors	21	15	6	3	Playoffs
5	Bacolod Bingo Plus	21	14	7	4	Playoffs

Source: Standings
Rules for classification: 1) Wins; 2a) If two teams are tied, head-to-head match-up; 2b) If three or more teams are tied, head-to-head point quotient; 3) overall point quotient; 4) coin toss.

=== Schedule ===
2022 Sarangani Marlins season schedule
Game	Date	Opponent	Score	Location	Record	Recap
1	April 25	Valenzuela	W 77–73	Batangas City Coliseum	1–0	
2	May 21	Rizal	W 94–83	Ynares Center	2–0	
3	May 28	Marikina	W 73–69	Batangas City Coliseum	3–0	
4	May 31	Pampanga	W 68–65	Bren Z. Guiao Convention Center	4–0	
5	June 14	General Santos	W 79–77	Strike Gymnasium	5–0	
6	July 2	Nueva Ecija	L 79–87	Orion Sports Complex	5–1	
7	July 11	Zamboanga	L 86–89	Bren Z. Guiao Convention Center	5–2	
8	July 22	Bacoor City	W 92–83	Marikina Sports Center	6–2	
9	July 29	Laguna	W 69–59	Laguna Sports Complex	7–2	
10	August 5	Muntinlupa	W 67–55	Muntinlupa Sports Center	8–2	
11	August 12	Bataan	W 92–80	San Jose del Monte Sports Complex	9–2	
12	August 16	Makati	W 70–59	Filoil EcoOil Centre	10–2	
13	August 23	Batangas City	L 66–75	Batangas City Coliseum	10–3	
14	September 2	San Juan	L 74–86	Filoil EcoOil Centre	10–4	
15	September 9	Quezon City	W 90–67	Sarangani Capitol Gymnasium	11–4	
16	September 10	Bacolod	L 75–89	Sarangani Capitol Gymnasium	11–5	
17	September 15	Imus City	W 79–78	Ynares Sports Arena	12–5	
18	September 20	Manila	W 74–55	Mayor Vitaliano D. Agan Coliseum	13–5	
19	October 8	Pasig City	W 93–76	Bren Z. Guiao Convention Center	14–5	
20	October 10	Mindoro	W 125–74	Muntinlupa Sports Center	15–5	
21	October 13	Caloocan	W 81–76	Caloocan Sports Complex	16–5	
Source: Schedule

== Playoffs ==
=== Schedule ===
2022 Sarangani Marlins playoff schedule
Round	Game	Date	Opponent	Score	Location	Series	Recap
Division quarterfinals	1	October 21	Rizal	L 45–73	Batangas City Coliseum	0–1	Recap
Division quarterfinals	2	October 28	Rizal	L 79–84	Ynares Sports Arena	0–2	Recap
Source: Schedule
