= 2022 Pampanga Giant Lanterns season =

Third season of the franchise in the MPBL

- Arena(s): Bren Z. Guiao Convention Center

Results
- Record: 14–7 (.667)
- Place: Division: 4th (North)
- Playoff finish: Division Semifinals (lost vs. Nueva Ecija, 0–2)

Pampanga Giant Lanterns seasons

The 2022 Pampanga Giant Lanterns season was the third season of the franchise in the Maharlika Pilipinas Basketball League (MPBL). This is also their first season in San Fernando, after playing in Angeles City during their first two seasons.

The Giant Lanterns' first game in San Fernando was a win against Manila on May 24. From July 22 until September 19, Pampanga earned eight consecutive wins as the team finished 14–7 in a three-way tie for the second seed in the North Division. By tiebreaker criteria, Pampanga settled the fourth seed, the same seed they were in previously. After a tight three-game series against the Bataan Risers, Pampanga would fall to the eventual champion Nueva Ecija Rice Vanguards in a sweep.

The team played all of their home games at Bren Z. Guiao Convention Center.

== Regular season ==
=== Standings ===
Pos	Team	Pld	W	L	GB	Qualification
2	Pasig City MCW Sports	21	14 (Note: Pasig (1.193), San Juan (0.993), and Pampanga (0.850) are ranked based on head-to-head point quotient.)	7	7	Playoffs
3	San Juan Knights	21	14	7	7	Playoffs
4	Pampanga Giant Lanterns	21	14	7	7	Playoffs
5	Bataan Risers	21	13	8	8	Playoffs
6	Valenzuela XUR Homes Realty Inc.	21	10	11	11	Playoffs

Source: Standings
Rules for classification: 1) Wins; 2a) If two teams are tied, head-to-head match-up; 2b) If three or more teams are tied, head-to-head point quotient; 3) overall point quotient; 4) coin toss.

=== Schedule ===
2022 Pampanga Giant Lanterns season schedule
Game	Date	Opponent	Score	Location	Record	Recap
1	May 24	Manila		Bren Z. Guiao Convention Center	1–0	
2	May 31	Sarangani		Bren Z. Guiao Convention Center	1–1	
3	June 6	Pasig City		Filoil Flying V Centre	1–2	
4	June 11	Rizal		Batangas City Coliseum	1–3	
5	June 21	Laguna		Orion Sports Complex	2–3	
6	June 25	Quezon City		Alonte Sports Arena	3–3	
7	July 5	Caloocan		Nueva Ecija Coliseum	4–3	
8	July 11	General Santos		Bren Z. Guiao Convention Center	4–4	
9	July 22	Muntinlupa		Marikina Sports Center	5–4	
10	July 30	Mindoro		Caloocan Sports Complex	6–4	
11	August 6	Batangas City		Bren Z. Guiao Convention Center	7–4	
12	August 15	Bacolod		Bren Z. Guiao Convention Center	8–4	
13	August 20	Imus City		Bren Z. Guiao Convention Center	9–4	
14	August 26	Bacoor City		Strike Gymnasium	10–4	
15	September 12	Bataan		Bren Z. Guiao Convention Center	11–4	
16	September 19	Marikina		Caloocan Sports Complex	12–4	
17	September 23	Nueva Ecija		Nueva Ecija Coliseum	12–5	
18	September 27	Makati		Ynares Sports Arena	13–5	
19	October 6	Zamboanga		Orion Sports Complex	13–6	
20	October 8	San Juan		Bren Z. Guiao Convention Center	13–7	
21	October 11	Valenzuela		Bren Z. Guiao Convention Center	14–7	
Source: Schedule

== Playoffs ==
=== Schedule ===
2022 Pampanga Giant Lanterns playoff schedule
Round	Game	Date	Opponent	Score	Location	Series	Recap
Division Quarterfinals	1	October 15	Bataan		Nueva Ecija Coliseum	1–0	Recap
Division Quarterfinals	2	October 22	Bataan		Bren Z. Guiao Convention Center	1–1	Recap
Division Quarterfinals	3	November 4	Bataan		Bren Z. Guiao Convention Center	2–1	Recap
Division Semifinals	1	November 7	Nueva Ecija		Nueva Ecija Coliseum	0–1	Recap
Division Semifinals	2	November 11	Nueva Ecija		Filoil EcoOil Centre	0–2	Recap
Source: Schedule
