= 2022 Bacolod Bingo Plus season =

Second season of the franchise in the MPBL

- Arena(s): La Salle Coliseum

Results
- Record: 14–7 (.667)
- Place: Division: 5th (South)
- Playoff finish: Division Semifinals (lost vs. Zamboanga, 1–2)

Bacolod Bingo Plus seasons

The 2022 Bacolod Bingo Plus season was the second season of the franchise in the Maharlika Pilipinas Basketball League (MPBL).

Bacolod sought to improved from their previous 11–19 outing in their inaugural season. They would surpass that in win percentage with their ninth win on September 2 and later surpass in wins with their twelfth on September 10. Despite a 5–7 record in the middle of the regular season, the team managed to finish with a 14–7 record and the fifth seed in the South Division.

In the playoffs, the team first met the GenSan Warriors, who they would in a three-game series to face against the Zamboanga Family's Brand Sardines in the Division Semifinals. Despite tying up the series in game 2, the Bingo Plus-backed team would lose to ZFAMS in another three-game series.

The team played both of their home games in back-to-back days (July 18 and 19) at La Salle Coliseum.

== Preseason ==
Bacolod was one of 22 teams that took part in the 2021 MPBL Invitational, competing as the All-Star Bacolod Ballers. They would fail to make the playoffs after finishing in third place in Group A.

=== Schedule ===
2021 All-Star Bacolod Ballers Invitational schedule
Stage	Game	Date	Opponent	Score	Location	Record	Recap
Group stage	1	December 11	Bacoor City	W 73–71	SM Mall of Asia Arena	1–0	
Group stage	2	December 12	Negros	W 68–67	SM Mall of Asia Arena	2–0	
Group stage	3	December 15	Iloilo	L 62–85	SM Mall of Asia Arena	2–1	
Group stage	4	December 16	Caloocan	W 85–65	SM Mall of Asia Arena	3–1	
Group stage	5	December 18	Pasig	L 61–86	SM Mall of Asia Arena	3–2	
Source: Schedule

== Regular season ==
=== Standings ===
Pos	Team	Pld	W	L	GB	Qualification
3	Sarangani Marlins	21	16	5	2	Playoffs
4	GenSan Warriors	21	15	6	3	Playoffs
5	Bacolod Bingo Plus	21	14	7	4	Playoffs
6	Rizal Golden Coolers	21	10	11	8	Playoffs
7	Bacoor City Strikers	21	9	12	9	Playoffs

Source: Standings
Rules for classification: 1) Wins; 2a) If two teams are tied, head-to-head match-up; 2b) If three or more teams are tied, head-to-head point quotient; 3) overall point quotient; 4) coin toss.

=== Schedule ===
2022 Bacolod Bingo Plus season schedule
Game	Date	Opponent	Score	Location	Record	Recap
1	May 2	Imus City		Filoil Flying V Centre	1–0	
2	May 16	San Juan		Filoil Flying V Centre	2–0	
3	May 31	Manila		Bren Z. Guiao Convention Center	3–0	
4	June 4	Marikina		San Andres Sports Complex	4–0	
5	June 18	Batangas City		Caloocan Sports Complex	4–1	
6	June 28	Laguna		Batangas City Coliseum	5–1	
7	July 9	Bataan		Orion Sports Complex	5–2	
8	July 18	Nueva Ecija		La Salle Coliseum	5–3	
9	July 19	Zamboanga		La Salle Coliseum	5–4	
10	August 2	Mindoro		Bren Z. Guiao Convention Center	6–4	
11	August 6	Pasig City		Bren Z. Guiao Convention Center	7–4	
12	August 15	Pampanga		Bren Z. Guiao Convention Center	7–5	
13	August 20	Rizal		Bren Z. Guiao Convention Center	7–6	
14	August 26	Valenzuela		Strike Gymnasium	8–6	
15	September 2	Caloocan		Filoil EcoOil Centre	9–6	
16	September 5	General Santos		Lagao Gymnasium	9–7	
17	September 6	Quezon City		Lagao Gymnasium	10–7	
18	September 9	Muntinlupa		Sarangani Capitol Gymnasium	11–7	
19	September 10	Sarangani		Sarangani Capitol Gymnasium	12–7	
20	September 17	Bacoor City		Strike Gymnasium	13–7	
21	September 29	Makati		Batangas City Coliseum	14–7	
Source: Schedule

== Playoffs ==
=== Schedule ===
2022 Bacolod Bingo Plus playoff schedule
Round	Game	Date	Opponent	Score	Location	Series	Recap
Division Quarterfinals	1	October 17	General Santos		Mayor Vitaliano D. Agan Coliseum	1–0	Recap
Division Quarterfinals	2	October 24	General Santos		Batangas City Coliseum	1–1	Recap
Division Quarterfinals	3	November 5	General Santos		Batangas City Coliseum	2–1	Recap
Division Semifinals	1	November 8	Zamboanga		Mayor Vitaliano D. Agan Coliseum	0–1	Recap
Division Semifinals	2	November 12	Zamboanga		Batangas City Coliseum	1–1	Recap
Division Semifinals	3	November 15	Zamboanga		Mayor Vitaliano D. Agan Coliseum	1–2	Recap
Source: Schedule
