= 2022 San Juan Knights season =

Third season of the franchise in the MPBL

- Arena(s): Filoil EcoOil Centre

Results
- Record: 14–7 (.667)
- Place: Division: 3rd (North)
- Playoff finish: Division Finals (lost vs. Nueva Ecija, 1–2)

San Juan Knights seasons

The 2022 San Juan Knights season was the third season of the franchise in the Maharlika Pilipinas Basketball League (MPBL).

Coming off of back-to-back National Finals appearances, San Juan's start to the season came out slow with only one win out of their first four games. The Knights would continue to push on by winning 13 of the remaining 17 games to finish the season 14–7 in a three-way tie for the second seed in the North. By tiebreaker criteria, San Juan would claim the third seed.

After sweeps against Valenzuela and Pasig City, San Juan would reach their third consecutive Division Finals appearance. They were matched against the Nueva Ecija Rice Vanguards, who have remained undefeated in 25 games up to that point. On opposing grounds, the Knights would lead the Rice Vanguards to their first loss of the entire season in game 1 of the North Division Finals series. Despite that, San Juan would fall to Nueva Ecija in the next two games, missing the National Finals for the first time in the team's MPBL history and igniting the rivalry between the two teams.

== Preseason ==
San Juan was one of 22 teams that took part in the 2021 MPBL Invitational. The team ended their run in the Quarterfinals after losing to the Pasig Sta. Lucia Realtors in the Quarterfinals.

=== Schedule ===
2021 San Juan Knights Invitational schedule
Stage	Game	Date	Opponent	Score	Location	Record	Recap
Group stage	1	December 11	Valenzuela	W 97–64	SM Mall of Asia Arena	1–0	
Group stage	2	December 13	Sarangani	W 91–72	SM Mall of Asia Arena	2–0	
Group stage	3	December 17	Muntinlupa	W 71–67	SM Mall of Asia Arena	3–0	
Group stage	4	December 19	Nueva Ecija	L 85–88	SM Mall of Asia Arena	3–1	
Playoffs	QF	December 21	Pasig	L 66–70	SM Mall of Asia Arena	3–2	
Source: Schedule

== Regular season ==
=== Standings ===
Pos	Team	Pld	W	L	GB	Qualification
1	Nueva Ecija Rice Vanguards	21	21	0	—	Playoffs
2	Pasig City MCW Sports	21	14 (Note: Pasig (1.193), San Juan (0.993), and Pampanga (0.850) are ranked based on head-to-head point quotient.)	7	7	Playoffs
3	San Juan Knights	21	14	7	7	Playoffs
4	Pampanga Giant Lanterns	21	14	7	7	Playoffs
5	Bataan Risers	21	13	8	8	Playoffs

Source: Standings
Rules for classification: 1) Wins; 2a) If two teams are tied, head-to-head match-up; 2b) If three or more teams are tied, head-to-head point quotient; 3) overall point quotient; 4) coin toss.

=== Schedule ===
2022 San Juan Knights season schedule
Game	Date	Opponent	Score	Location	Record	Recap
1	May 16	Bacolod		Filoil Flying V Centre	0–1	
2	May 30	Valenzuela		Filoil Flying V Centre	1–1	
3	June 6	Zamboanga		Filoil Flying V Centre	1–2	
4	June 13	Pasig City		Batangas City Coliseum	1–3	
5	June 25	Laguna		Alonte Sports Arena	2–3	
6	July 4	Imus City		Bren Z. Guiao Convention Center	3–3	
7	July 12	Nueva Ecija		Nueva Ecija Coliseum	3–4	
8	July 25	Muntinlupa		Muntinlupa Sports Center	4–4	
9	July 29	Quezon City		Laguna Sports Complex	5–4	
10	August 1	Makati		Batangas City Coliseum	6–4	
11	August 5	Bacoor City		Muntinlupa Sports Center	6–5	
12	August 9	Caloocan		Strike Gymnasium	7–5	
13	August 16	Batangas City		Filoil EcoOil Centre	7–6	
14	August 22	Marikina		San Andres Sports Complex	8–6	
15	September 2	Sarangani		Filoil EcoOil Centre	9–6	
16	September 13	Mindoro		Nueva Ecija Coliseum	10–6	
17	September 17	Manila		Strike Gymnasium	11–6	
18	September 24	Bataan		Orion Sports Complex	12–6	
19	September 27	General Santos		Ynares Sports Arena	12–7	
20	September 29	Rizal		Batangas City Coliseum	13–7	
21	October 8	Pampanga		Bren Z. Guiao Convention Center	14–7	
Source: Schedule

== Playoffs ==
=== Schedule ===
2022 San Juan Knights playoff schedule
Round	Game	Date	Opponent	Score	Location	Series	Recap
Division Quarterfinals	1	October 18	Valenzuela		Ynares Sports Arena	1–0	Recap
Division Quarterfinals	2	October 25	Valenzuela		Filoil EcoOil Centre	2–0	Recap
Division Semifinals	1	November 7	Pasig City		Nueva Ecija Coliseum	1–0	Recap
Division Semifinals	2	November 11	Pasig City		Filoil EcoOil Centre	2–0	Recap
Division Finals	1	November 18	Nueva Ecija		Nueva Ecija Coliseum	1–0	Recap
Division Finals	2	November 21	Nueva Ecija		Filoil EcoOil Centre	1–1	Recap
Division Finals	3	November 25	Nueva Ecija		Nueva Ecija Coliseum	1–2	Recap
Source: Schedule
