= Do (surname) =

Do is a surname of multiple origins.

== Derivations ==
- Do or Doh (Korean: 도), the romanization of the Korean surname
  - According to the 2000 South Korean census, there were 54,779 people in 16,952 households with the surname spelled Do in Revised Romanization of Korean. In a study based on a sample of applications for South Korean passports in 2007, 86.9% chose to spell it as Do, 9.7% as Doh, and 1.1% as Toh.
- Đỗ or Do, a Vietnamese surname
- Do, Italian surname, from the Lombard name of Ono San Pietro

== People ==
=== Korean origin ===
- Do
- Hangul: 도
- Hanja: 都, 陶, 道, 到, 度, 桃, 覩
- RR: Do
- MR: To

- Do Dong-hyun (born 1993), South Korean professional footballer
- Do Eun-chul (born 1963), South Korean former cyclist
- Do Hwa-sung (born 1980), South Korean footballer
- Do Ji-han (born 1991), South Korean actor
- Do Ji-won (born 1966), South Korean actress
- Do Jong-hwan (born 1955), South Korean poet and politician, former Minister of Culture, Sports and Tourism
- Do Kum-bong (1930–2009), South Korean actress
- Do Kyung-soo (born 1993), South Korean singer and actor, member of boy band EXO
- Do Han-se (born 1997), South Korean rapper and singer, member of boy band Victon
- Do Sang-woo (born 1987), South Korean actor and model
- Do Sunwoo (born 1971), South Korean writer

=== Vietnamese origin ===
- Anh Do (born 1977), Vietnamese-Australian author, actor, comedian, painter
- Do Anh Vu (1113–1158), official in the royal court of Lý Anh Tông, the sixth emperor of the Lý Dynasty
- Do Cao Tri (1929–1971), general in the Army of the Republic of Vietnam
- Cong Thanh Do (born 1959), Vietnamese American human rights activist
- Do Hoang Diem (born 1963), former chairman of the pro-democracy party Việt Tân
- Khoa Do (born 1979), Vietnamese-Australian film director, screenwriter, philanthropist
- Mattie Do (born 1981), Laotian American film director
- Do Mau (1917–2002), South Vietnamese military officer and politician
- Michelle Do (born 1983), Vietnamese-American table tennis player
- Minh Quan Do (born 1984), Vietnamese retired tennis player
- Do Muoi (1917–2018), Vietnamese communist politician
- Do Nhuan (1922–1991), Vietnamese classical composer
- Quinn Do (born 1975), American professional poker player
- Do Thanh Nhon (died 1781), Vietnamese 18th-century military commander
- Do Thi Ha (born 2001), Vietnamese model, beauty pageant titleholder, Miss Vietnam 2020
- Do Thi Hai Yen (born 1982), Vietnamese actress
- Do Thi Minh (born 1988), Vietnamese retired volleyball player
- Thi Ngan Thuong Do (born 1989), Vietnamese artistic gymnast
- Tristan Do (born 1993), Thai professional footballer
- Yen Ngoc Do (1941–2006), Vietnamese American newspaper publisher, founder of Nguoi Viet Daily News

=== Others ===
- Giovanni Do (c. 1617–c. 1656), Spanish painter
