= 2022 Batangas City Embassy Chill season =

Fourth season of the franchise in the MPBL

- Arena(s): Batangas City Coliseum

Results
- Record: 17–4 (.810)
- Place: Division: 2nd (South)
- Playoff finish: Division Finals (lost vs. Zamboanga, 1–2)

Batangas City Embassy Chill seasons

The 2022 Batangas City Embassy Chill season was the fourth season of the franchise in the Maharlika Pilipinas Basketball League (MPBL).

Renamed as the Embassy Chill, the team started the season with a ten-game winning streak. Despite going 2–3 in their last five games, Batangas City still managed to claim the second seed in the South with a 17–4 record.

After a three-game series with Bacoor City and a sweep against Rizal, the Embassy Chill managed to make their way back to the South Division Finals, this time against the Zamboanga Family's Brand Sardines. Despite winning game 1 of the series, Batangas City would lose the next two, including the deciding game 3, which they would lose by one point.

The team played all of their home games this season at Batangas City Coliseum.

== Regular season ==
=== Standings ===
| Pos | Team | Pld | W | L | GB | Qualification |
|---|---|---|---|---|---|---|
| 1 | Zamboanga Family's Brand Sardines | 21 | 18 | 3 | — | Playoffs |
| 2 | Batangas City Embassy Chill | 21 | 17 | 4 | 1 | Playoffs |
| 3 | Sarangani Marlins | 21 | 16 | 5 | 2 | Playoffs |
| 4 | GenSan Warriors | 21 | 15 | 6 | 3 | Playoffs |
| 5 | Bacolod Bingo Plus | 21 | 14 | 7 | 4 | Playoffs |

Source: Standings
Rules for classification: 1) Wins; 2a) If two teams are tied, head-to-head match-up; 2b) If three or more teams are tied, head-to-head point quotient; 3) overall point quotient; 4) coin toss.

=== Schedule ===
2022 Batangas City Embassy Chill season schedule
| Game | Date | Opponent | Score | Location | Record | Recap |
|---|---|---|---|---|---|---|
| 1 | April 25 | Imus City | | Batangas City Coliseum | 1–0 | |
| 2 | May 17 | Pasig City | | Batangas City Coliseum | 2–0 | |
| 3 | May 28 | General Santos | | Batangas City Coliseum | 3–0 | |
| 4 | June 11 | Marikina | | Batangas City Coliseum | 4–0 | |
| 5 | June 18 | Bacolod | | Caloocan Sports Complex | 5–0 | |
| 6 | June 28 | Mindoro | | Batangas City Coliseum | 6–0 | |
| 7 | July 11 | Valenzuela | | Bren Z. Guiao Convention Center | 7–0 | |
| 8 | July 16 | Makati | | Muntinlupa Sports Center | 8–0 | |
| 9 | July 23 | Laguna | | Ynares Sports Arena | 9–0 | |
| 10 | August 1 | Zamboanga | | Batangas City Coliseum | 10–0 | |
| 11 | August 6 | Pampanga | | Bren Z. Guiao Convention Center | 10–1 | |
| 12 | August 13 | Manila | | Strike Gymnasium | 11–1 | |
| 13 | August 16 | San Juan | | Filoil EcoOil Centre | 12–1 | |
| 14 | August 23 | Sarangani | | Batangas City Coliseum | 13–1 | |
| 15 | August 30 | Bacoor City | | Orion Sports Complex | 14–1 | |
| 16 | September 12 | Rizal | | Bren Z. Guiao Convention Center | 15–1 | |
| 17 | September 15 | Bataan | | Ynares Sports Arena | 15–2 | |
| 18 | September 20 | Muntinlupa | | Mayor Vitaliano D. Agan Coliseum | 16–2 | |
| 19 | September 29 | Caloocan | | Batangas City Coliseum | 16–3 | |
| 20 | October 7 | Nueva Ecija | | Nueva Ecija Coliseum | 16–4 | |
| 21 | October 13 | Quezon City | | Caloocan Sports Complex | 17–4 | |
Source: Schedule

== Playoffs ==
=== Schedule ===
2022 Batangas City Embassy Chill playoff schedule
| Round | Game | Date | Opponent | Score | Location | Series | Recap |
|---|---|---|---|---|---|---|---|
| Division Quarterfinals | 1 | October 21 | Bacoor City | | Batangas City Coliseum | 1–0 | Recap |
| Division Quarterfinals | 2 | October 28 | Bacoor City | | Ynares Sports Arena | 1–1 | Recap |
| Division Quarterfinals | 3 | November 5 | Bacoor City | | Batangas City Coliseum | 2–1 | Recap |
| Division Semifinals | 1 | November 8 | Rizal | | Mayor Vitaliano D. Agan Coliseum | 1–0 | Recap |
| Division Semifinals | 2 | November 12 | Rizal | | Batangas City Coliseum | 2–0 | Recap |
| Division Finals | 1 | November 19 | Zamboanga | | Mayor Vitaliano D. Agan Coliseum | 1–0 | Recap |
| Division Finals | 2 | November 22 | Zamboanga | | Batangas City Coliseum | 1–1 | Recap |
| Division Finals | 3 | November 26 | Zamboanga | | Mayor Vitaliano D. Agan Coliseum | 1–2 | Recap |
Source: Schedule
