= 2022 Pasig City MCW Sports season =

Third season of the franchise in the MPBL

- Arena(s): Ynares Sports Arena

Results
- Record: 14–7 (.667)
- Place: Division: 2nd (North)
- Playoff finish: Division Semifinals (lost vs. San Juan, 0–2)

Pasig City MCW Sports seasons

The 2022 Pasig City MCW Sports season was the third season of the franchise in the Maharlika Pilipinas Basketball League (MPBL).

Initially starting the season as simply Pasig City, the team first tallied a 6–5 record before going on a seven-game winning streak to lift them up to 13–5. Their 13th win on September 24 also surpassed their previous 18–12 campaign in win percentage. Pasig City finished the season as one of three teams to finish 14–7 in a tie for second place in the North Division. Pasig City would claim that position by tiebreaker criteria.

The team began their playoff run with a sweep against Quezon City MG before taking on the San Juan Knights in the Division Semifinals, who they would be swept by.

The team only played one home game this season, during the playoffs on October 18, moving away from Pasig Sports Center and setting up shop at Ynares Sports Arena.

== Preseason ==
Pasig City is one of 22 teams that took part in the 2021 MPBL Invitational, still going by its former name, the Pasig Sta. Lucia Realtors. After losing in the Semifinals against Basilan Jumbo Plastic, the team beat Imus Buracai de Laiya to clinch third place in the tournament.

=== Schedule ===
2021 Pasig Sta. Lucia Realtors Invitational schedule
| Stage | Game | Date | Opponent | Score | Location | Record | Recap |
|---|---|---|---|---|---|---|---|
| Group stage | 1 | December 13 | Iloilo | W 90–69 | SM Mall of Asia Arena | 1–0 | |
| Group stage | 2 | December 15 | Bacoor City | W 76–67 | SM Mall of Asia Arena | 2–0 | |
| Group stage | 3 | December 17 | Caloocan | W 87–60 | SM Mall of Asia Arena | 3–0 | |
| Group stage | 4 | December 18 | Bacolod | W 86–61 | SM Mall of Asia Arena | 4–0 | |
| Group stage | 5 | December 20 | Negros | W 85–73 | SM Mall of Asia Arena | 5–0 | |
| Playoffs | QF | December 21 | San Juan | W 70–66 | SM Mall of Asia Arena | 6–0 | |
| Playoffs | SF | December 22 | Basilan | L 72–77 | SM Mall of Asia Arena | 6–1 | |
| Playoffs | 3rd | December 23 | Imus | W 100–80 | SM Mall of Asia Arena | 7–1 | |
Source: Schedule

== Regular season ==
=== Standings ===
| Pos | Team | Pld | W | L | GB | Qualification |
|---|---|---|---|---|---|---|
| 1 | Nueva Ecija Rice Vanguards | 21 | 21 | 0 | — | Playoffs |
| 2 | Pasig City MCW Sports | 21 | 14 (Note: Pasig (1.193), San Juan (0.993), and Pampanga (0.850) are ranked based on head-to-head point quotient.) | 7 | 7 | Playoffs |
| 3 | San Juan Knights | 21 | 14 | 7 | 7 | Playoffs |
| 4 | Pampanga Giant Lanterns | 21 | 14 | 7 | 7 | Playoffs |
| 5 | Bataan Risers | 21 | 13 | 8 | 8 | Playoffs |

Source: Standings
Rules for classification: 1) Wins; 2a) If two teams are tied, head-to-head match-up; 2b) If three or more teams are tied, head-to-head point quotient; 3) overall point quotient; 4) coin toss.

=== Schedule ===
2022 Pasig City season schedule
| Game | Date | Opponent | Score | Location | Record | Recap |
|---|---|---|---|---|---|---|
| 1 | May 17 | Batangas City | | Batangas City Coliseum | 0–1 | |
| 2 | May 30 | Mindoro | | Filoil Flying V Centre | 1–1 | |
| 3 | June 6 | Pampanga | | Filoil Flying V Centre | 2–1 | |
| 4 | June 13 | San Juan | | Batangas City Coliseum | 3–1 | |
| 5 | June 25 | Zamboanga | | Alonte Sports Arena | 3–2 | |
| 6 | July 9 | Rizal | | Orion Sports Complex | 4–2 | |
| 7 | July 16 | General Santos | | Muntinlupa Sports Center | 4–3 | |
| 8 | July 25 | Imus City | | Muntinlupa Sports Center | 5–3 | |
| 9 | August 1 | Marikina | | Batangas City Coliseum | 6–3 | |
| 10 | August 6 | Bacolod | | Bren Z. Guiao Convention Center | 6–4 | |
| 11 | August 13 | Quezon City | | Strike Gymnasium | 6–5 | |
| 12 | August 22 | Manila | | San Andres Sports Complex | 7–5 | |
| 13 | August 26 | Bataan | | Strike Gymnasium | 8–5 | |
| 14 | September 2 | Muntinlupa | | Filoil EcoOil Centre | 9–5 | |
| 15 | September 12 | Valenzuela | | Bren Z. Guiao Convention Center | 10–5 | |
| 16 | September 16 | Caloocan | | Muntinlupa Sports Center | 11–5 | |
| 17 | September 22 | Makati | | Strike Gymnasium | 12–5 | |
| 18 | September 24 | Laguna | | Orion Sports Complex | 13–5 | |
| 19 | September 28 | Nueva Ecija | | Laguna Sports Complex | 13–6 | |
| 20 | October 3 | Bacoor City | | Paco Arena | 14–6 | |
| 21 | October 8 | Sarangani | | Bren Z. Guiao Convention Center | 14–7 | |
Source: Schedule

== Playoffs ==
=== Schedule ===
2022 Pasig City MCW Sports playoff schedule
| Round | Game | Date | Opponent | Score | Location | Series | Recap |
|---|---|---|---|---|---|---|---|
| Division Quarterfinals | 1 | October 18 | Quezon City | | Ynares Sports Arena | 1–0 | Recap |
| Division Quarterfinals | 2 | October 25 | Quezon City | | Filoil EcoOil Centre | 2–0 | Recap |
| Division Semifinals | 1 | November 7 | San Juan | | Nueva Ecija Coliseum | 0–1 | Recap |
| Division Semifinals | 2 | November 11 | San Juan | | Filoil EcoOil Centre | 0–2 | Recap |
Source: Schedule
