= Ray Du English =

Taiwanese educational YouTube channel

Ray Du English (阿滴英文)
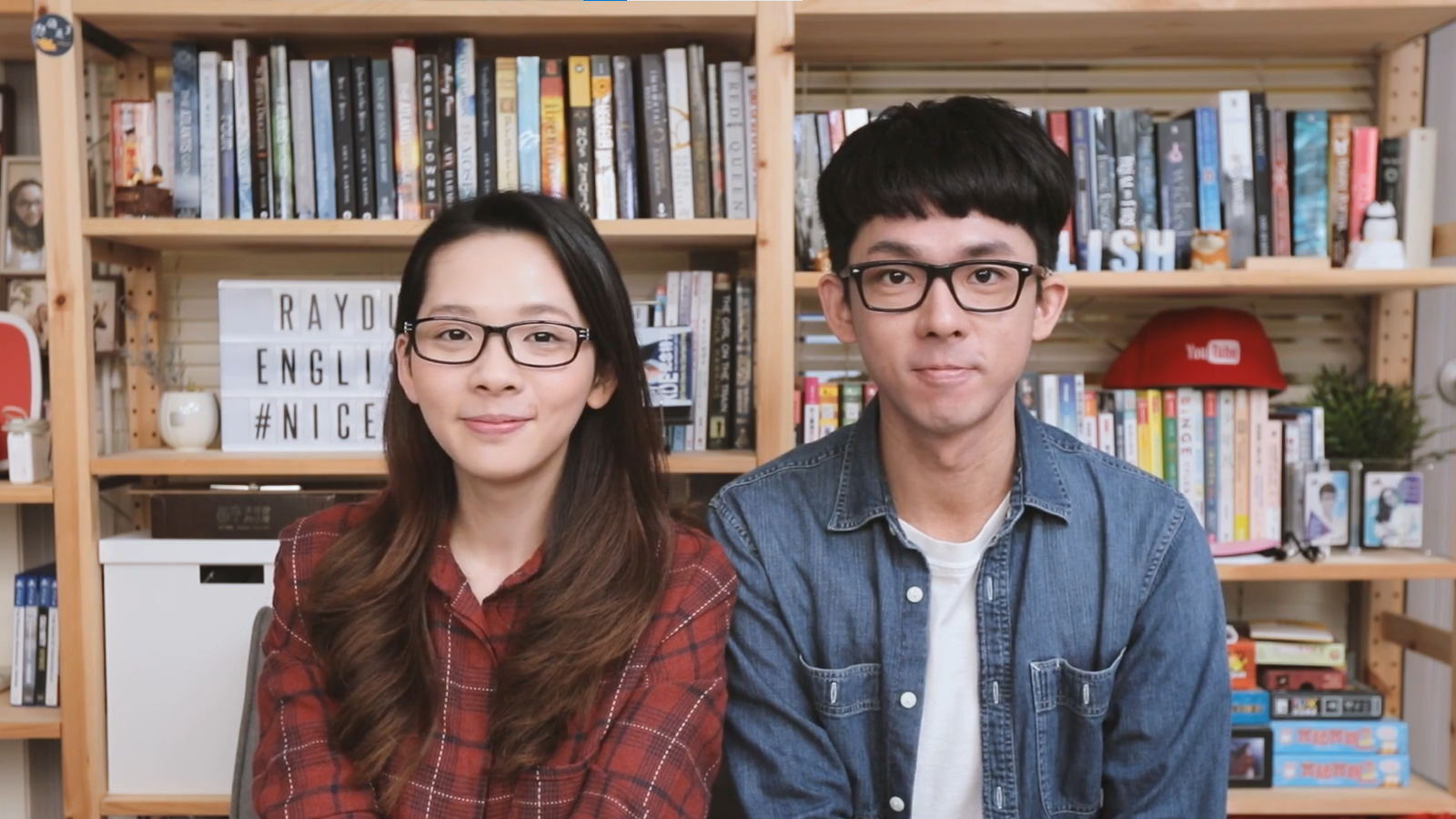

YouTube information
- Channel: 阿滴英文
- Years active: 2015–present
- Genre: English education
- Subscribers: 2.70 million
- Views: 291.27 million
- Last updated: 10 July 2022
- Website: rayduenglish.com

Ray Du English (Chinese: 阿滴英文; Pe̍h-ōe-jī: A-tek Eng-bûn) is a Taiwanese educational YouTube channel hosted by two siblings, including the titular Ray Du (都省瑞; Pe̍h-ōe-jī: To͘ Séng-sūi), who have posted English education materials since 2015. Their unconventional approach to English education has been featured positively in various Taiwanese media outlets.

== Profile ==
Both Ray Du and his sister Crown Du graduated from the well-known Fu Jen Catholic University Department of English Language and Literature. Ray obtained a master's degree from Fu Jen, which prompted him to found Ray Du English.

== Key events ==
On 30 March 2018, Ray Du stated that his sister, Crown Du, does not exist and is a product of intellectual creation. Later, he published another video, confirmed the video earlier was just an April Fools' Day joke.

On 10 April 2020, Ray Du, along with graphic designer Aaron Nieh and other like-minded individuals, initiated a fundraising campaign aimed to showcase Taiwan's efforts and willingness to help in the fight against the COVID-19 coronavirus pandemic by publishing an advertisement in the New York Times. The "Taiwan Can Help" campaign raised around NT$10 million (US$330,000) from over 26,000 contributors. The advert was published in the New York Times on 14 April 2020.

In July 2021, after relatively low activities, Ray Du revealed that he was suffered from mood disorder when he finished the "Taiwan Can Help" campaign earlier. Ray has recovered from mood disorder in 2021, and wrote a book explaining the detail.

== Publications ==
- Du, Ray (1 June 2017). 英語每日一滴：IG最夯，學校不教，聊天、搭訕、吐槽都有戲. Taiwan: 如何. ISBN 9789861364889.
- 跟著阿滴滴妹說出溜英文：網路人氣影片系列《10句常用英文》大補帖. Taiwan: EZ叢書館. 4 July 2018. ISBN 978-9-862-48733-4.
- 按下暫停鍵也沒關係：在憂鬱症中掙扎了一年，我學到的事. Taiwan: 如何出版. 1 June 2022. ISBN 978-986-136-623-4.

== See also ==
- List of most-subscribed YouTube channels
