= Kaitlyn Fisher =

Fijian netball player (born 2000)

Personal information
- Born: 7 June 2000 (age 26)
- Occupation: netball player
- Height: 1.76 m (5 ft 9 in)

Netball career
- Playing positions: goal attack, wing attack, center

Kaitlyn Fisher (born 7 June 2000) is an Australian-based Fijian netball player who plays for Fiji in the positions of goal attack, wing attack or center. She was included in the Fijian squad for the 2019 Netball World Cup which was also her maiden appearance at a Netball World Cup.
