= Ema Mualuvu =

Fijian netball player (born 1999)

Personal information
- Born: 19 June 1999 (age 27)
- Occupation: Netball player
- Height: 1.83 m (6 ft 0 in)

Netball career
- Playing positions: Wing defense, Goal defense

Ema Mualuvu (born 19 June 1999) is a Fijian netball player who plays for Fiji in the positions of goal defense or wing defense. She was included in the Fijian squad for the 2019 Netball World Cup, which was also her maiden appearance at a Netball World Cup.
