= Shawallah Rashid =

Singaporean netball player (born 1993)

Personal information
- Born: 15 April 1993 (age 32)
- Occupation: netball player
- Height: 1.72 m (5 ft 7 1/2 in)

Netball career
- Playing position(s): wing attack, wing defense, center

Shawallah Rashid (born 15 April 1993) is a Singaporean netball player who represents Singapore internationally and plays in the positions of center, wing attack or wing defense. She was part of the Singaporean squad at the 2019 Netball World Cup, which was also her first World Cup appearance.
