= Đỗ =

Đỗ (Chữ Hán: 杜) is a Vietnamese family name. According to Lê Trung Hoa, a Vietnamese scholar, approximately 3.1 percent of Vietnamese people have this surname (2005).

== Origin ==
Story tells that Đế Minh, grandson of Thần Nông (Shennong) when passing by Nanling, he met and married a fairy named Đỗ Quý (also known as Princess Đoan Trang, she was often referred as Do Quý Thị (Lady Quý of House of Đỗ). She then gave birth to Tuc Lo, later became Kinh Dương Vương, father of Lạc Long Quân.

Another person that many Vietnamese with this surname claim to be descended from is Đỗ Cảnh Thạc, a warlord during the 12 Lords Rebellion.

== Notable Đỗ ==
- Anh Do - Vietnamese Australian comedian/actor
- Đỗ Anh Vũ (1113–1158), official in the royal court of Lý Anh Tông, the sixth emperor of the Lý Dynasty
- Đỗ Cao Trí (1929–1971), general in the Army of the Republic of Vietnam
- Đỗ Duy Nam (born 1990), Vietnamese actor, comedian and television personality
- Đỗ Hoàng Điềm (born 1963), Vietnamese democracy advocate
- Khoa Do, Vietnamese Australian actor/director, younger brother of Anh Do
- Đỗ Mậu (1917–2002), general in the Army of the Republic of Vietnam
- Đỗ Minh Quân (born 1984), Vietnamese tennis player
- Đỗ Mười, 20th century politician
- Đỗ Nhuận (1922–1991), Vietnamese classical composer
- Đỗ Thanh Nhơn, 18th century military commander
- Đỗ Thị Hải Yến (born 1982), Vietnamese actress
- Đỗ Thị Minh (born 1988), Vietnamese volleyball player
- Đỗ Thị Hà (born 2001), Miss Vietnam 2020

== See also ==
- Do (surname)
