= Aqilah Andin =

Singaporean netball player (born 1996)

Personal information
- Full name: Nur Aqilah Afiqah Bte Andin Agustino Saman
- Born: 14 March 1996 (age 30)
- Occupation: netball player
- Height: 1.74 m (5 ft 8 1/2 in)

Netball career
- Playing position(s): goal keeper, goal defense, wing defense
Medal record
Representing Singapore
Women's netball
Asian Netball Championships
Gold medal – first place	2014 Singapore	team
Nations Cup
Silver medal – second place	2019 Singapore	team
Southeast Asian Games
Silver medal – second place	2017 Kuala Lumpur	team
Silver medal – second place	2019 Tagaytay	team

Nur Aqilah Afiqah Bte Andin Agustino Saman also simply known as Nur Aqilah Andin (born 14 March 1996) is a Singaporean netball player and current vice captain of the Singapore national team who plays in the positions of goal keeper, goal defense or wing defense. She was part of the Singaporean squad at the 2019 Netball World Cup, which was also her first World Cup appearance.

Aqilah was part of the victorious Singaporean squad during the 2014 Asian Netball Championships and was also a member of the Singaporean contingent which bagged silver at the 2017 Southeast Asian Games.

In September 2019, she was included in the Singaporean squad for the 2019 M1 Nations Cup and was part of the national team which emerged as runners-up to Namibia in the final.
