= Joan Nampungu =

Ugandan netball player (born 1998)

Personal information
- Born: November 11, 1998 (age 27) Nsambya, Uganda
- Occupation: netball player
- Height: 1.71 m (5 ft 7 1/2 in)

Netball career
- Playing position: goal defense
Medal record
Representing Uganda
World University Netball Championship
Gold medal – first place	2018 Kampala	Team

Joan Nampungu (born 11 November 1998) is an Ugandan netball player who represents Uganda internationally and plays in the position of goal defense. She has represented Uganda at the 2018 Commonwealth Games and at the 2019 Netball World Cup.

In September 2019, she was included in the Ugandan squad for the 2019 African Netball Championships.

== Background and Education ==
Joan Nampungu was born to Mr. Saazi Cosia Ssebakijje and Mrs. Aminah Najjuma. She studied at Mackay Memorial Primary School, St. Mary's Kitende Secondary School, and went to Nkumba University for a bachelor's degree in Records and Information Management.
