= Do Sunwoo =

South Korean writer

- Occupation: Novelist
- Notable work: Sparring, Justice Man
- Awards: Munhakdongne Novel Award, Segye Literature Prize

Do Sunwoo (Korean: 도선우; born 1971) is a South Korean writer.

== Life ==
Do Sunwoo was born and raised in Seoul, South Korea. He made his literary debut in 2016, when his novel Sparring (스파링) was selected for the 22nd Munhakdongne Novel Award. In the following year, his 2017 novel Justice Man (저스티스맨) won the 13th Segye Literature Prize, given by Korean newspaper Segye Ilbo.

== Writing ==
Do's work often depicts structural violence in neoliberal societies delivered by the power of narrative. For example, his first novel Sparring (스파링), tells the story of a boxer's life who faces violent aspects of society, which evolve through small-scale social groups to large-scale society, such as school and political systems. In the 2016 winter issue of the quarterly Munhakdongne, the panel of judges identified the persuasive narratives portraying the irony of modern society and well-established writing technique as reasons why Sparring was selected as the winner of Munhakdongne Novel Award

In his second novel Justice Man (저스티스맨), Do tells a story about a mysterious serial killer, through which he portrays pervasive violence on the Internet. Lim Chulwoo, a member of the judge panel for Segye Literature Prize wrote that the main appeal of Justice Man is "the world of web portals, the existence of anonymous evil in the virtual world, and sharp and serious insights about its violence and blindness." According to Seong-kon Kim, a professor emeritus of English at Seoul National University, this novel also depicts how our society "is swarming with people who are intoxicated with the notion that they alone represent 'justice' and all others embody injustice."

== Works ==
- Sparring (스파링), 2016
- Justice Man (저스티스맨), 2017
- Mojo Society (모조사회), 2019

== Awards ==
- Munhakdongne Novel Award, 2016
- Segye Literature Prize, 2017
