= Netball in Singapore =

- Country: Singapore
- National team: Singapore
- Registered players: 80,000

There are 80,000 netball players in Singapore. playing several variations of netball, including beach netball. Sport Singapore (formerly known as Singapore Sports Council) is responsible for maintaining 8 netball courts. Netball Singapore is the official governing body for the sport in Singapore. It was created in 1962, with 63 registered clubs.

== International tournaments ==
In 1983, the country held the 1983 Netball World Championships. In 2001, Singapore hosted the INFA World Congress. In 2005, the country hosted the Asian Netball Championships. In 2006, Netball Singapore created and hosted the first major Asian netball tournament, The Nations Cup. The 13th World Netball Championships was held in Singapore in 2011.

== National team ==
Singapore has several national squads: Opens, 21 & Under, 19 & Under (Post School), 19 & Under (Schools), 17 & Under, and 14 & Under. The national team competed in its first major tournament in 1967 at the Netball World Championships. Singapore had a national team compete in the fifth Asian Netball Championships held in Colombo, Sri Lanka in 2001. Singapore competed in the 7th Asian Youth Netball Championship held in 2010 in India. As of August 2016, the women's national team was ranked number seventeenth in the world.

Some of the top performances for the Singapore national netball teams include:

- 2010 Asian Youth Netball Championship: Third

== Professional league ==
In 2000, the professional Netball Super League (NSL) was established and governed by Netball Singapore.

The Netball Super League, comprising six teams, is a seven-week-long netball tournament developed to cater for professional netball players in Singapore. In 2004, the audience was big enough that the league was broadcast on television.

== Bibliography ==
- All England Netball Association (1976). Golden jubilee : 1926–1976. All England Netball Association. OCLC 39500756.
- DaCosta, Lamartine P.; Miragaya, Ana (2002). Worldwide experiences and trends in sport for all. Meyer & Meyer Sport. ISBN 1-84126-085-1. OCLC 248362122.
- Fazilah (27 April 2009). "Marlin's Stung". thestar.com.my. Archived from the original on 5 March 2011.
- Government of Sri Lanka (21 July 2001). "5th Asian Netball Championship next week in Colombo". Archived from the original on 26 January 2004.
- International Federation of Netball Associations (21 January 2011a). "Current World Rankings". Archived from the original on 19 May 2011.
- International Federation of Netball Associations (15 June 2008). "History of Netball". Archived from the original on 6 March 2011.
- Netball Singapore (2010). "National Squads". Archived from the original on 15 March 2011.
- Netball Singapore (19 December 2009). "Nations Cup 2009". Archived from the original on 15 March 2011.
- Netball Singapore (30 September 2008). "Nations Cup 2008".
- Netball Singapore (15 July 2010b). "Asian Youth Netball Championship". Archived from the original on 15 March 2011.
- Netball Singapore (13 December 2010a). "NTUC FairPrice Foundation Nations Cup 2010". Archived from the original on 6 March 2011.
- Netball Singapore (2011). "About Us". Archived from the original on 1 March 2011.
- Netball Singapore (2011b). "Milestones". Archived from the original on 18 February 2011.
- Sagar, Naresh (4 July 2010). "Asian Youth Netball Championship". Sagar Media. Archived from the original on 15 July 2011.
