= Pauline Jani =

Zimbabwean netball player (1989–2023)

Personal information
- Born: 10 July 1989; Hippo Valley Estate, Zimbabwe
- Died: 11 October 2023 (aged 34); Harare, Zimbabwe
- Height: 1.91 m (6 ft 3 in)
- Occupation: Netball player

Netball career
- Playing position(s): Goal keeper, goal shooter

Pauline Jani (10 July 1989 – 11 October 2023) was a Zimbabwean netball player who represented Zimbabwe internationally and played in the positions of goal keeper and goal shooter. Born in 1989 at Hippo Valley Estate, she was a member of the Zimbabwean squad which finished at eighth position during the 2019 Netball World Cup, which was historically Zimbabwe's first ever appearance at a Netball World Cup tournament. She announced her retirement from the sport at the age of 30 after playing in Zimbabwe's last group stage match against Uganda at the 2019 World Cup.

Jani died at Parirenyatwa Hospital in Harare on 11 October 2023, at the age of 34.
