= Admiral Muskwe =

Zimbabwean footballer (born 1998)

Personal information
- Full name: Admiral Dalindlela Muskwe
- Date of birth: 21 August 1998 (age 28)
- Place of birth: Harare, Zimbabwe
- Height: 1.83 m (6 ft 0 in)
- Position: Forward

Team information
- Current team: Wealdstone

Youth career
- 2007–2020: Leicester City

Senior career*
Years	Team	Apps	(Gls)
2020–2021	Leicester City	0	(0)
2020	→ Swindon Town (loan)	5	(0)
2021	→ Wycombe Wanderers (loan)	17	(3)
2021–2024	Luton Town	22	(0)
2022–2023	→ Fleetwood Town (loan)	12	(3)
2023–2024	→ Exeter City (loan)	6	(0)
2024	Harrogate Town	1	(0)
2025	IFK Mariehamn	7	(0)
2025–2026	Morecambe	17	(5)
2026–	Wealdstone	0	(0)

International career
2014	England U17	4	(2)
2017–2023	Zimbabwe	7	(1)
- * Club domestic league appearances and goals as of 6 August 2026

Admiral Dalindlela Muskwe (born 21 August 1998) is a Zimbabwean professional footballer who plays as a forward for National League side Wealdstone.

== Club career ==
Muskwe signed for local team Leicester City at the age of nine in 2007. In May 2016 he was named the club's Academy Player of the Season, and one month later signed his first professional contract to keep him at the club until 2019.

On 28 January 2020, Muskwe joined Swindon Town on loan for the rest of the season.

His next loan was at Wycombe Wanderers, who he signed for on 5 January 2021. He made his debut for Wycombe in the FA Cup against Preston North End on 9 January 2021. On his league debut for Wycombe, against Brentford, he scored his first professional goal on 30 January 2021.

On 15 July 2021, Muskwe joined Championship side Luton Town for an undisclosed fee.

On 24 May 2024, Luton announced he would be leaving in the summer when his contract expired.

On 2 December 2024, Muskwe joined League Two side Harrogate Town on a short-term deal. He left the club at the end of the month.

On 27 January 2025, after a successful trial, IFK Mariehamn in Finnish Veikkausliiga announced the signing of Muskwe for the 2025 season. He left the club on 11 August.

Muskwe signed with Morecambe on 22 August 2025. On 16 May 2026, Morecambe announced he was being released.

On 6 August 2026, Muskwe joined National League side Wealdstone.

== International career ==
Muskwe represented the England national team at the under-17 level, making his debut in the 2014 U17 Nordic Tournament. He scored two goals in four appearances in the tournament.

In November 2017 Muskwe made his senior international debut, appearing as a second-half substitute for Zimbabwe in a 1–0 defeat to Lesotho.

== Personal life ==
Muskwe and his twin sister Adelaide were born in 1998 at Parirenyatwa Hospital in Harare, Zimbabwe. They moved to the United Kingdom when he was three. One source says that the twins were born and raised in England, and another says that Muskwe and his twin sister did not live in the UK until they were three.

== Career statistics ==
=== Club ===
As of 11 August 2025

Appearances and goals by club, season and competition
Club	Season	League			National cup (Note: Includes FA Cup and Suomen Cup)		League cup (Note: Includes EFL League Cup and Finnish League Cup)		Other		Total	
Club	Season	Division	Apps	Goals	Apps	Goals	Apps	Goals	Apps	Goals	Apps	Goals
Leicester City	2019–20	Premier League	0	0	0	0	0	0	—		0	0
Leicester City	2020–21	Premier League	0	0	0	0	0	0	—		0	0
Leicester City	Total		0	0	0	0	0	0	0	0	0	0
Leicester City U23	2016–17	—			—		—		4 (Note: Appearances in EFL Trophy)	0	4	0
Leicester City U21	2017–18	—			—		—		2	0	2	0
Leicester City U21	2019–20	—			—		—		5	2	5	2
Swindon Town (loan)	2019–20	League Two	5	0	0	0	0	0	0	0	5	0
Wycombe Wanderers (loan)	2020–21	Championship	17	3	2	0	0	0	—		19	3
Luton Town	2021–22	Championship	20	0	2	1	1	1	—		23	2
Luton Town	2022-23	Championship	2	0	0	0	1	0	—		3	0
Luton Town	2023-24	Premier League	0	0	0	0	0	0	—		0	0
Luton Town	Total		22	0	2	1	2	1	0	0	26	2
Fleetwood Town (loan)	2022–23	League One	12	3	1	0	0	0	1	0	14	3
Exeter City (loan)	2023–24	League One	6	0	1	0	1	0	0	0	8	0
Harrogate Town	2024–25	League Two	1	0	0	0	0	0	0	0	1	0
IFK Mariehamn	2025	Veikkausliiga	7	0	1	0	0	0	–		8	0
Career total			70	6	7	1	3	1	12	2	92	10

=== International ===
Appearances and goals by national team and year
National team	Year	Apps	Goals
Zimbabwe	2017	1	0
Zimbabwe	2019	3	1
Zimbabwe	2022	2	0
Zimbabwe	2023	1	0
Total		7	1

Scores and results list Zimbabwe's goal tally first, score column indicates score after each Muskwe goal.

List of international goals scored by Admiral Muskwe
No.	Date	Venue	Opponent	Score	Result	Competition
1	10 September 2019	National Sports Stadium, Harare, Zimbabwe	Somalia	2–1	3–1	2022 FIFA World Cup qualification

== Honours ==
Zimbabwe

- COSAFA Cup bronze: 2019
