= Shuyi Kwok =

Singaporean netball player (born 1990)

Personal information
- Born: 13 June 1990 (age 36)
- Occupation: netball player
- Height: 1.72 m (5 ft 7 1/2 in)

Netball career
- Playing position(s): center, wing attack, wing defense
Medal record
Representing Singapore
Women's netball
Nations Cup
Silver medal – second place	2019 Singapore	team
Southeast Asian Games
Silver medal – second place	2019 Tagaytay	team

Shuyi Kwok (born 13 June 1990) is a Singaporean netball player who represents Singapore internationally and plays in the positions of center, wing attack or wing defense. She was part of the Singaporean squad at the 2019 Netball World Cup, which was also her first World Cup appearance.

In September 2019, she was included in the Singaporean squad for the 2019 M1 Nations Cup and was part of the national team which emerged as runners-up to Namibia in the final.
