= Jesca Achan =

Ugandan netball player (born 1991)

Personal information
- Born: 12 January 1991 (age 35)
- Occupation: netball player
- Height: 1.59 m (5 ft 2 1/2 in)

Netball career
- Playing position: center

Jesca Achan (born 12 January 1991) is an Ugandan netball player who represents Uganda internationally and plays in the center position. She was part of Ugandan squad at the 2019 Netball World Cup.

In September 2019, she was included in the Ugandan squad for the 2019 African Netball Championships.
