= Du Mu (Ming dynasty) =

15th-century Chinese poet and scholar

Du Mu (Chinese: 都穆; 1459–1525) was a Chinese antiquarian, art critic, poet, and travel writer from Suzhou, known for his travel writing about famous mountains.

Du was a friend and patron to Wen Zhengming.

== Works ==
- You Mingshan ji [Accounts of Travelling to Famous Mountains]
