= Junping Du =

Chinese computer scientist

Junping Du (Chinese: 杜军平) is a Chinese computer scientist with highly varied research interests including publications on image restoration, crowdsourced face recognition, document summarization, distributed consensus, computational trust, virtualization in Hadoop-based distributed computation, multi-agent systems, state estimation for tracking mobile robots, training of neural networks, signal processing using Kalman filters, and robust control for automated vehicles. She is a professor of computer science at the Beijing University of Posts and Telecommunications.

Du was born in Beijing, and completed a Ph.D. in computer science at the University of Science and Technology Beijing in 1998. She joined the Beijing University of Posts and Telecommunications in 2006, after postdoctoral research at Tsinghua University.

She was named an IEEE Fellow, in the 2024 class of fellows, "for contributions to modeling and intelligent analysis of big data".
