= Sindhu Nair =

Summary

Personal information
- Born: 6 October 1995 (age 30)
- Occupation(s): Advocate & Solicitor, Netball Player
- Height: 1.73 m (5 ft 8 in)

Netball career
- Playing position(s): goal keeper, goal defence, wing defence
Medal record
Representing Singapore
Women's netball
Nations Cup
Silver medal – second place	2019 Singapore	team
Southeast Asian Games
Silver medal – second place	2019 Tagaytay	team
Asian Netball Championships
Gold medal – first place	2024 Bangalore	team

Sindhu Nair (born 6 October 1995) is a Singaporean netball player who represents Singapore internationally and plays in the positions of goal keeper, goal defence or wing defence. She was part of the Singaporean squad at the 2019 Netball World Cup, marking her first World Cup appearance.

Nair's netball career began at Singapore's Evergreen Primary School, where she starred alongside youth netball legend Sheena Suthen. In September 2019, she was included in the Singaporean squad for the 2019 M1 Nations Cup and was part of the national team which emerged as runners-up to Namibia in the final.

Nair suffered an ACL tear in April 2023, forcing her to put her netball career on hold. Despite her injuries, Nair came back stronger than before, making her first appearance, post-injury at the 2024 Nations Cup. This also marked her 50th International Cap playing for the Singapore Netball team.

In 2024, Nair was part of the Singapore National Team, Singapore Vandas, that emerged as Champions in the 2024 Asian Netball Championships. This marked the first time that Singapore won the Asian Netball Games in 10 years.

Outside of netball, Nair is also called an Advocate & Solicitor of the Supreme Court of Singapore.
