= Sylvia Nanyonga =

Ugandan netball player (born 1984)

Personal information
- Born: 21 October 1984 (age 40)
- Height: 1.68 m (5 ft 6 in)
- Occupation: netball player

Netball career
- Playing position(s): wing defense

Sylvia Nanyonga (born 21 October 1984) is an Ugandan netball player who represents Uganda internationally and plays in the position of wing defense. She made her debut World Cup appearance for Uganda during the 2019 Netball World Cup.
