= Carmen Goh =

Singaporean netball player (born 1990)

Personal information
- Full name: Carmen Jia Man Goh
- Born: 21 December 1990 (age 35)
- Occupation: netball player
- Height: 1.62 m (5 ft 4 in)

Netball career
- Playing position: center
Medal record
Representing Singapore
Women's netball
Nations Cup
Silver medal – second place	2019 Singapore	team
Southeast Asian Games
Silver medal – second place	2019 Tagaytay	team

Carmen Goh (born 21 December 1990) is a Singaporean netball player who represents Singapore internationally and plays in the position of center. She was part of the Singaporean squad at the 2019 Netball World Cup, which was also her first World Cup appearance.

In September 2019, she was included in the Singaporean squad for the 2019 M1 Nations Cup and was part of the national team which emerged as runner-up to Namibia in the final.
