= Ariana Luamanu =

Samoan netball player

Personal information
- Born: 30 June 2002 (age 24) Armstrong Creek, Victoria, Australia
- Occupation: netball player
- Height: 1.68 m (5 ft 6 in)

Netball career
- Playing positions: wing attack, centre
Years	National team	Caps
- Samoa

Ariana Luamanu (born 30 June 2002) is a Samoan netball player who represents Samoa internationally and plays in the positions of wing attack and centre. She made her international debut for Samoa at the age of 15 in December 2017.

She made her maiden World Cup appearance representing Samoa at the 2019 Netball World Cup. Ariana was selected into the Samoan squad for the tournament while she was pursuing her high school education at the Geelong Grammar School.
