= Asilika Sevutia =

Fijian netball player (born 1988)

Personal information
- Born: 15 July 1988 (age 37)
- Occupation: netball player
- Height: 1.70 m (5 ft 7 in)

Netball career
- Playing positions: center, wing attack, wing defense

Asilika Sevutia (born 15 July 1988) is a Fijian netball player and current vice captain of the Fiji national team who plays in the positions of center, wing attack or wing defense.

Sevutia was identified is a promising junior netballer by Fiji netball team coach Melissa Walker in 2009.

She was included in the Fijian squad as the vice captain for the 2019 Netball World Cup, which was also her maiden appearance at a Netball World Cup.
