= Ndaizivei Madzikangava =

Zimbabwean netball player

Personal information
- Height: 1.50 m (4 ft 11 in)
- Occupation: netball player

Netball career
- Playing position(s): wing attack, wing defense, center

Ndaizivei Madzikangava is a Zimbabwean netball player who represents Zimbabwe internationally and plays in the positions of wing attack and wing defense. She was a member of the Zimbabwean squad during the 2019 Netball World Cup, which was historically Zimbabwe's first ever appearance at a Netball World Cup tournament.
