= Gwangsan Tak clan =

Korean clan from Gwangju

- Country: Korea
- Current region: Gwangju
- Founder: Tak Ji yeop
- Website: http://www.humap.kr/

Gwangsan Tak clan (Korean: 광산 탁씨; Hanja: 光山 卓氏) is a Korean clan. Their Bon-gwan was in Gwangju. According to the research in 2015, the number of Gwangsan Tak clan was 19551. Their founder was Tak Ji yeop. He had an ancestor who was appointed as Podeokhu (Hanja: 布德侯) in Han dynasty. He served as Hanlin Academy in Goryeo during Seonjong of Goryeo’s reign. He began Gwangsan Tak clan because he was appointed as Prince of Gwangsan (Hanja: 光山君).

== See also ==
- Korean clan names of foreign origin
