= Charmaine Soh =

Singaporean netball player (born 1990)

Personal information
- Born: 24 March 1990 (age 36) Singapore
- Height: 1.77 m (5 ft 9 1/2 in)

Netball career
- Playing position(s): GA, GS
Medal record
Representing Singapore
Women's netball
Asian Netball Championships
Gold medal – first place	2012 Colombo	Team
Gold medal – first place	2014 Singapore	Team
Silver medal – second place	2018 Singapore	Team
Bronze medal – third place	2016 Bangkok	Team
Southeast Asian Games
Gold medal – first place	2015 Kallang	Team
Silver medal – second place	2017 Kuala Lumpur	Team
Silver medal – second place	2019 Tagaytay	Team
Nations Cup
Gold medal – first place	2023 Singapore	Team
Silver medal – second place	2019 Singapore	Team
Bronze medal – third place	2017 Singapore	Team

Charmaine Soh Shi Hui (born 24 March 1990) is a retired Singaporean netball player and former captain of the Singapore national team who played either as a goal attack or goal shooter. Charmaine officially captained the national side at the 2019 Netball World Cup replacing Vanessa Marie Lee who took a brief break from the sport in 2018. She has featured in three World Cup tournaments for Singapore in 2011, 2015 and 2019. She is Singapore's most-capped netballer, with 128 competitive appearances.

Charmaine retired in 2023, playing and winning her 128th game for Singapore in the 2023 Nations Cup final.

== Career ==
Charmaine Soh had been a regular member of the Singaporean team since 2011 following her debut Netball World Cup appearance during the 2011 edition. She was a member of the Singaporean team which emerged as champions during the 2012 Asian Netball Championships defeating home side Sri Lanka 48–47 in a close thriller. She was one of the key members of the Singaporean contingent which claimed gold medal in the women's netball event during 2015 Southeast Asian Games and was part of the Singaporean squad which bagged silver at the 2017 Southeast Asian Games.

Soh made her captaincy debut in 2019 as she captained the national side at the 2019 Netball World Cup tournament where the team finished at last position among the 16 teams.

Soh is widely known for her calm composure and her ability to shoot from anywhere around the shooting circle, making her shooting accuracy comparable to the likes of the world's best shooters such as Maria Folau according to multiple commentators commenting on matches between Singapore and their opponents during the 2015 Netball World Cup and the 2019 Netball World Cup

In October 2019, she was included in the Singaporean squad for the 2019 M1 Nations Cup and was retained as the captain of the team for the tournament. She was part of the national team which emerged as runners-up to Namibia in the final.

On 24 August 2021, World Netball announced that Charmaine was its official Ambassador for the Asia Region.

On 28 October 2023, Charmaine played her last game for Singapore, in a 59–56 win over Papua New Guinea, winning her first and only Nations Cup gold medal.
