= Rudo Karume =

Zimbabwean netball player (born 1989)

Personal information
- Born: 1 December 1989 (age 35)
- Height: 1.60 m (5 ft 3 in)
- Occupation: netball player

Netball career
- Playing position(s): goal defense

Rudo Karume (born 1 December 1989) is a former Zimbabwean netball player who represented Zimbabwe internationally and played in the position of goal defense. She was a member of the Zimbabwean squad which finished at eighth position during the 2019 Netball World Cup, which was historically Zimbabwe's first ever appearance at a Netball World Cup tournament. She announced her retirement from the sport at the age of 29 following the 2019 World Cup.
