= Lenora Misa =

Samoan netball player (born 1997)

Personal information
- Born: 19 December 1997 (age 28)
- Height: 1.78 m (5 ft 10 in)

Netball career
- Playing positions: GD, GK
Years	Club team	Apps
2020	QUT Wildcats	
2020	Queensland Fusion	
Years	National team	Caps
- Samoa

Lenora Misa (born 19 December 1997) is a Samoan netball player who represents Samoa internationally and plays in the positions of goal defense and goal keeper. She made her maiden World Cup appearance representing Samoa at the 2019 Netball World Cup.
