= Perpetua Siyachitema =

Zimbabwean netball player (born 1983)

Personal information
- Born: 15 May 1983 (age 43) Chitungwiza, Zimbabwe
- Occupation: netball player
- Height: 1.63 m (5 ft 4 in)

Netball career
- Playing positions: centre, wing attacker WA

Perpetua Siyachitema (born 15 May 1983) is a former Zimbabwean veteran netball player and captain of the Zimbabwe national team. She had played for Zimbabwe in international arena for 15 years and announced her retirement post the 2019 Netball World Cup. On 25 July 2019, she announced her retirement from international netball at the age of 36 to pursue her coaching career. She is known for her efforts to help Zimbabwe qualify at the Netball World Cup for the first time in 2019.

== Career ==
Perpetua started playing the sport of netball from sixteen years of age and made her international debut for Zimbabwe at the age of 19. She had been a regular permanent member of the Zimbabwean team for nearly fifteen years since her debut and led the side since 2011.

Under her captaincy, Zimbabwe qualified to participate at the 2019 Netball World Cup along with fellow African team Uganda. This was the first occasion where Zimbabwe secured a spot at a Netball World Cup tournament. At the 2019 Netball World Cup, Zimbabwe started its tournament on a winning note defeating Sri Lanka and finished the tournament on eighth position. Following the remarkable feat, Perpetua bid farewell to her netball career after playing nearly for 20 years.
