= Patricia Mauladi =

Zimbabwean netball player (born 1996)

Personal information
- Born: 22 January 1996 (age 29)
- Height: 1.64 m (5 ft 4 1/2 in)
- Occupation: netball player

Netball career
- Playing position(s): wing attack, wing defense

Patricia Mauladi (born 22 January 1996) is a Zimbabwean netball player who represents Zimbabwe internationally and plays in the positions of wing attack and wing defense. She was a member of the Zimbabwean squad which finished at eighth position during the 2019 Netball World Cup, which was historically Zimbabwe's first ever appearance at a Netball World Cup tournament.
