= Adelaide Muskwe =

Zimbabwean netball player

Personal information
- Full name: Adelaide Thandeke Muskwe
- Born: 21 August 1998 (age 28) Harare, Zimbabwe
- Occupation: netball player
- Height: 1.77 m (5 ft 9 1/2 in)

Netball career
- Playing positions: goal defense, wing defense

Adelaide Thandeke Muskwe (born 21 August 1998) is a Zimbabwean netball player who represents Zimbabwe internationally and plays in the positions of goal defense and wing defense.

== Life ==
Muske and her twin brother Admiral were born in 1998 at Parirenyatwa Hospital in Harare, Zimbabwe. They moved to the United Kingdom when they were three. Her talents led to her attending Ratcliffe College near Loughborough where she trained with the elite netball team Loughborough Lightning and trained also at UK national camps. Adelaide is a Nottingham Trent University graduate in Sports Science and she has signed for the Severn Stars netball team in 2019 who are based in Worcester.

She was a member of the Zimbabwean squad which finished at eighth position during the 2019 Netball World Cup, which was historically Zimbabwe's first ever appearance at a Netball World Cup tournament.
