= Aliti Toribau =

Fijian netball player (born 2001)

Personal information
- Born: 19 March 2001 (age 25)
- Occupation: netball player
- Height: 1.70 m (5 ft 7 in)

Netball career
- Playing positions: center, wing attack, wing defense

Aliti Toribau (born 19 March 2001) is a Fijian netball player who plays in the positions of center, wing attack or wing defense.

She was included in the Fijian squad for the 2019 Netball World Cup, which was also her maiden appearance at a Netball World Cup.
