= Melody Teo =

Singaporean netball player (born 1991)

Personal information
- Born: 2 July 1991 (age 34)
- Occupation: netball player
- Height: 1.76 m (5 ft 9 1/2 in)

Netball career
- Playing position(s): goal keeper, goal defense, wing defense
Medal record
Representing Singapore
Women's netball
Asian Netball Championships
Southeast Asian Games
Silver medal – second place	2017 Kuala Lumpur	team

Melody Teo (born 2 July 1991) is a Singaporean netball player who represents Singapore internationally since 2008 and plays in the positions of goal keeper, goal defense or wing defense. She was part of the Singaporean squad at the 2019 Netball World Cup, which was also her first World Cup appearance.

Melody was also a member of the Singaporean contingent which bagged silver at the 2017 Southeast Asian Games.

In September 2019, she was included in the Singaporean squad for the 2019 M1 Nations Cup.
