= Toh Kai Wei =

Singaporean netball player (born 1996)

Personal information
- Born: 21 August 1996 (age 29)
- Occupation: Netball player
- Height: 1.71 m (5 ft 7 1/2 in)

Netball career
- Playing position(s): Goal shooter, goal attack, wing attack
Medal record
Representing Singapore
Women's netball
Southeast Asian Games
Silver medal – second place	2019 Tagaytay	team

Toh Kai Wei (born 21 August 1996) is a Singaporean netball player who represents Singapore internationally and plays in the positions of goal attack, goal shooter or wing attack. She was part of the Singaporean squad at the 2019 Netball World Cup, which was also her first World Cup appearance.

In September 2019, she was included in the Singaporean squad for the 2019 M1 Nations Cup.

In September 2024, she led the Singapore team to victory at the asian netball championships, defeating reigning champion Sri Lanka and clinching the gold medal.
