= Toh Kian Chui =

Toh Kian Chui (Chinese: 卓键水 1 October 1927 - 9 November 2000) was a philanthropist and multi-millionaire businessman in the construction industry from Singapore. Chui started one of the first road construction companies in Singapore, named the Swee Constructions in 1948. Swee Constructions paved the first runway for the Singapore Changi Airport in the 1960s. The company was also responsible for the building of the facilities in Kusu Island that was enlarged and transformed from two tiny outcrops on a reef, into an island holiday resort. Mr Toh was a generous contributor to many charities in Singapore, and was awarded both the Public Service Star and Public Service Medal by the government of Singapore.

== Legacy ==
Toh has a foundation named after him; the Toh Kian Chui foundation.

In 2013 the foundation donated S$20 million to the Lee Kong Chian School of Medicine (LKCMedicine). The gift has gone towards setting up an endowment to fund a Distinguished Professorship, a Gold Medal student award, scholarships, research and education. In recognition of the gift, the education wing of LKCMedicine's Novena campus, Toh Kian Chui Annex, was named after Toh.

== Personal life ==
Toh had three children, Toh Keng Hong, Toh Keng Choo, and Toh Keng Siong.
