= Stella Nanfuka =

Ugandan netball player (born 1997)

Personal information
- Born: July 22, 1997 (age 28) Luzira, Uganda
- Occupation: netball player
- Height: 1.65 m (5 ft 5 in)

Netball career
- Playing position: goal keeper

Stella Nanfuka (born 22 July 1997) is an Ugandan netball player who represents Uganda internationally and plays in the position of goal keeper. She has represented Uganda at the 2018 Commonwealth Games and at the 2019 Netball World Cup.

In September 2019, she was included in the Ugandan squad for the 2019 African Netball Championships.
