= Pei Shan Lee =

Singaporean netball player (born 1999)

Personal information
- Full name: Pei Shan Lee
- Born: 15 September 1999 (age 26)
- Height: 1.87 m (6 ft 1 1/2 in)
- Occupation: netball player

Netball career
- Playing position(s): goal shooter

Pei Shan Lee also known as Lee Pei Shan (born 15 September 1999) is a Singaporean netball player who represents Singapore internationally and plays in the position of goal shooter. She was part of the Singaporean squad at the 2019 Netball World Cup, which was also her first World Cup appearance.

In September 2019, she was included in the Singaporean squad for the 2019 M1 Nations Cup.
