= Joanna Toh =

Singaporean netball player (born 1996)

Personal information
- Full name: Joanna Xin Yin Toh
- Born: 3 October 1996 (age 28)
- Height: 1.86 m (6 ft 1 in)
- Occupation: netball player

Netball career
- Playing position(s): goal keeper

Joanna Toh (born 3 October 1996) is a Singaporean netball player who represents Singapore internationally and plays in the position of goalkeeper. She was part of the Singaporean squad at the 2019 Netball World Cup, which was also her first World Cup appearance.
