= Xinyi Tan =

Singaporean netball player (born 1996)

Personal information
- Born: 21 May 1996 (age 29)
- Occupation: netball player
- Height: 1.79 m (5 ft 10 1/2 in)

Netball career
- Playing position(s): goal attack, goal shooter

Xinyi Tan (born 21 May 1996) is a Singaporean netball player who represents Singapore internationally and plays in the positions of goal shooter or goal attack. She was part of the Singaporean squad at the 2019 Netball World Cup, which was also her first World Cup appearance.
