= Zimbabwe national netball team =

- Association: Zimbabwe Netball Association
- Confederation: Africa Netball
- Head coach: Ropafadzo Mutsauki
- Asst coach: Wisdom Tatenda Shinya
- World ranking: 13
Team colours

Netball World Cup
- Appearances: 2 (Debuted in 2019)
- 2023 placing: 13th
- Best result: 8th (2019)

The Zimbabwe national netball team is the national netball team of Zimbabwe. As of 1 July 2020, Zimbabwe are 12th in the INF World Rankings.

== History ==
=== Players ===
The members of the national team are:

Zimbabwe national netball team
Players	Coaching staff
Joyce Takaidza; Pauline Jani; Rudo Karume; Felisitus Kwangwa; Claris Kwaramba; Ndaizivei Madzikangava; Sharleen Makusha; Patricia Mauladi; Adelaide Muskwe; Ursula Ndlovu; Perpetua Siyachitema; Sharon Bwanali	Head coach: Lloyd Makunde

The Zimbabwe Netball Association has forwarded its bid to host the regional 2013 Confederation of Southern African Netball Associations tournament.

In 2018 Zimbabwe qualified for their first ever Netball World Cup, qualifying alongside Uganda.

== Competitive history ==
Netball World Cup
Year	Cup	Location	Placing
2019	15th World Cup	Liverpool, England	8th
2023	16th World Cup	Cape Town, South Africa	13th
