= Santa Rosa Sports Complex =

Indoor sporting arena in Laguna, Philippines

City of Santa Rosa Multi-Purpose Complex
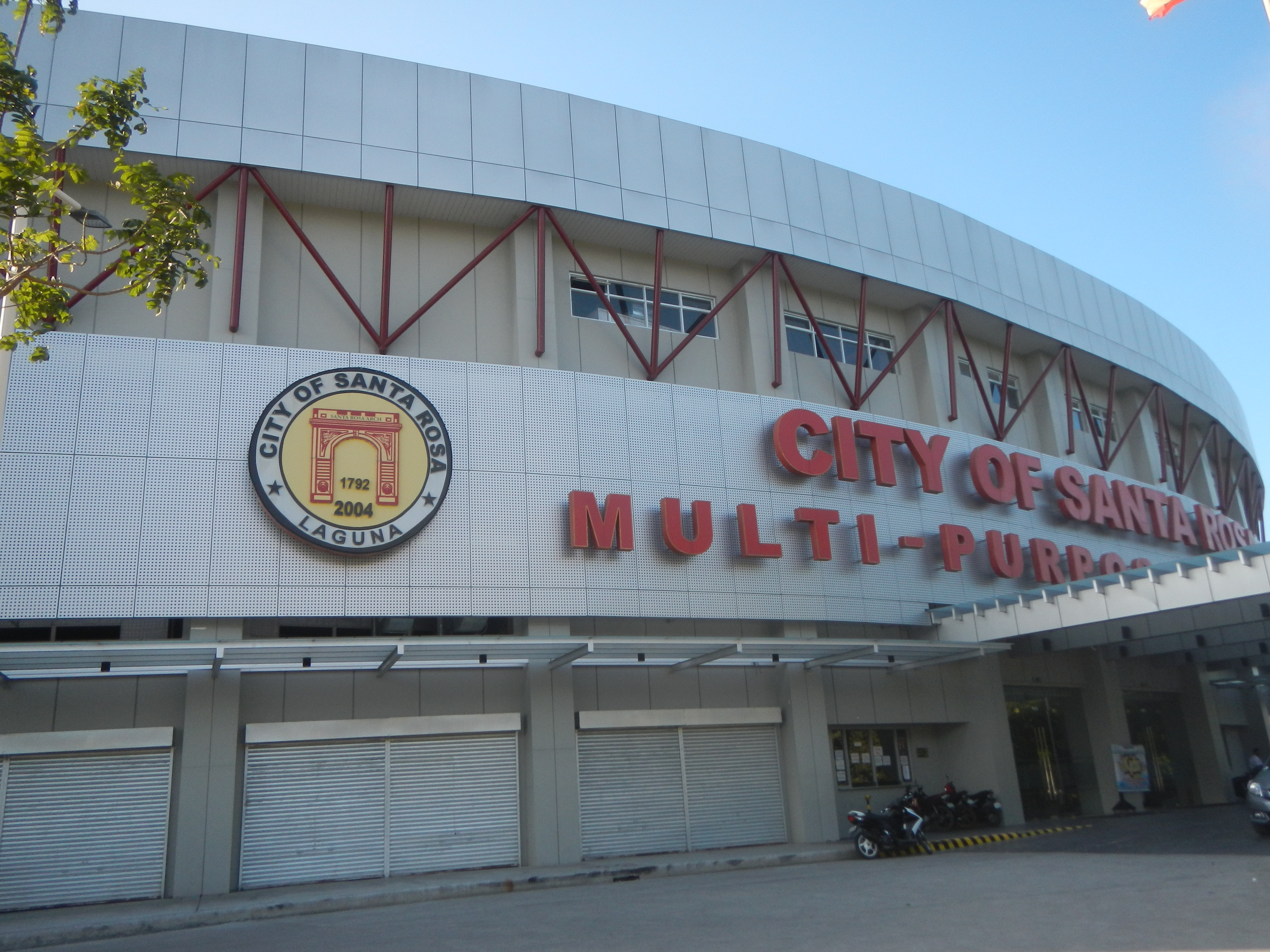
- Interactive map of City of Santa Rosa Multi-Purpose Complex
- Location: Leon Arcillas Boulevard, Santa Rosa, Laguna, Philippines
- Coordinates: 14°18′42.9″N 121°06′17.2″E
- Owner: Santa Rosa City Government
- Capacity: 5,700

Construction
- Groundbreaking: 2015; 11 years ago
- Opened: March 5, 2017; 9 years ago

Tenants
- Philippine Basketball Association (out-of-town games); Philippine Super Liga; San Miguel Alab Pilipinas (2017–2019); Laguna Krah Asia (MPBL) (2019–2020, 2023); Santa Rosa Laguna Lions (PSL) (2022–2023); TNT Tropang Giga (during EASL) (2023–2024)

The City of Santa Rosa Multi-Purpose Complex, more commonly referred to as the Santa Rosa Sports Complex, is an indoor arena in Santa Rosa, Laguna, Philippines with a capacity of 5,700 spectators. The construction of the sports arena began in 2015 and was officially inaugurated on March 5, 2017.

== Tenants ==
The arena currently serves as a home venue for the Laguna Krah Asia of the Maharlika Pilipinas Basketball League (MPBL) and the Biñan Tatak Gel of the Maharlika Pilipinas Volleyball Association (MPVA). It is also one of the playing venues of the Philippine Basketball Association (PBA) and the now-defunct Philippine Super Liga. It is the venue for the sport of netball at the 2019 Southeast Asian Games.

San Miguel Alab Pilipinas used this as one of their home venues while playing in the ASEAN Basketball League, including all but one playoff game in their championship run during the 2017–18 ABL season. The Santa Rosa Laguna Lions also used the arena as their home venue during the Pilipinas Super League's DUMPER Cup. The TNT Tropang Giga, while nominally does not have a home court, used the arena as their exclusive home court in the 2023–24 East Asia Super League.
