= Netball in Asia =

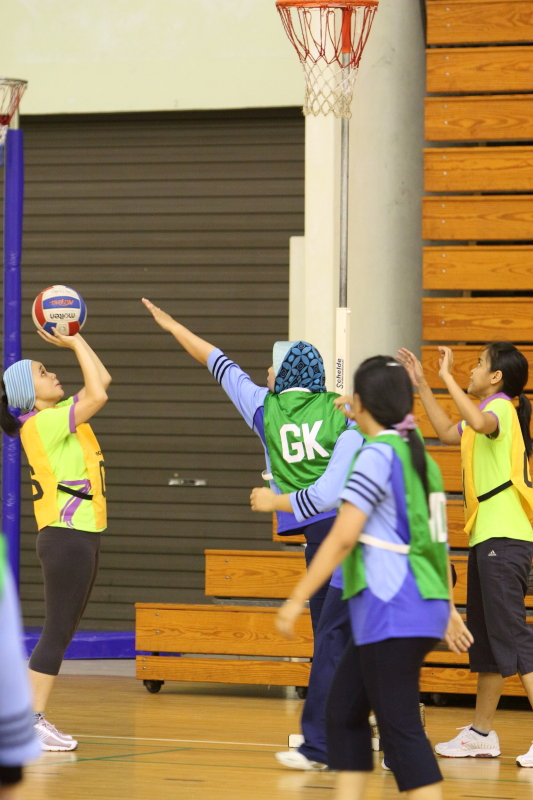
BKP Netball Tournament at the SHHB Sports Complex in Berakas, Brunei (May 2009).

Netball is popular in several parts of Asia. The IFNA Asia region includes countries such as Australia (geopolitically considered part of Oceania), India, Malaysia, Singapore and Sri Lanka. The major regional competition is the Asian Netball Championship. In 1994, the first Asian Youth Championship was held in Hong Kong.

== Australia ==
Netball has the highest participation rate of any team sport—male or female—in Australia; however, it has not managed to become a large spectator sport. In 2005 and 2006, netball was the 10th most popular spectator sport for women after tennis. The country set an attendance record for a netball match with a record crowd of 14,339 at the Australia – New Zealand Netball Test held at the Sydney SuperDome game in 2004.

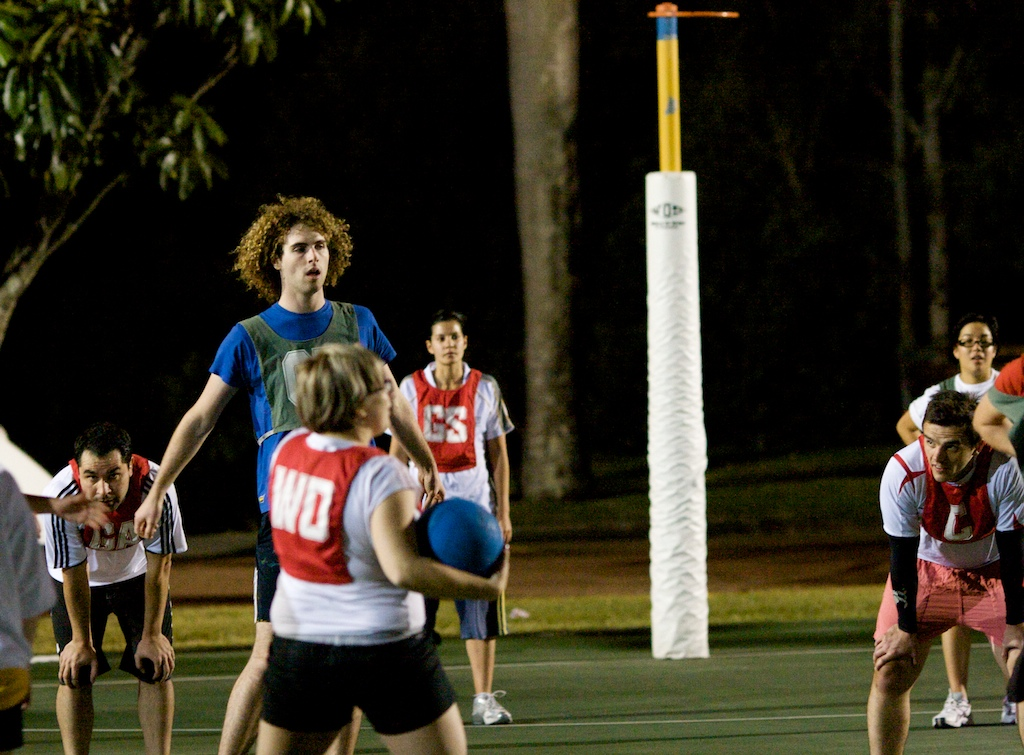
Local mixed netball game in Brisbane, Queensland.

Netball was brought to Australia by English school teachers, with a team having been organised by 1904 at Parramatta Superior Schools. In 1927, a national federation for the sport, Australian Women's Basketball Association, was created. During the 1930s in Australia, much of the participation in netball at universities was not organised and players were not required to register. It was believed that this was a positive for netball as it allowed people to participate who might not have participated otherwise. Australia's national team toured England in 1957. This tour resulted in a number of Commonwealth countries meeting together in order to try to standardise the rules of the game. The sport's name "netball" became official in Australia in 1970. Netball was one of the eight foundation sports when the Australian Institute of Sport was created. The national federation changed their name to Netball Australia in 1995. The Government of New South Wales committed over A$5,000,000 to creating and improving sporting facilities in the state. Some of this funding went to improving netball facilities.

In Australia 80% of netball is played at netball clubs. The number of netball clubs around Australia has been in decline since the 1940s. Still, there are around 350,000 registered players and over 1.2 million total players in the country. Prior to the creation of the ANZ Championship, the National Netball League was the major competition in Australia. It included teams from the Australian Capital Territory, New South Wales, Queensland, Victoria, South Australia and Western Australia.

The Australian national netball team is regarded as the most successful netball team in international netball. It won the first world championships in 1963 in England, and nine of the twelve Netball World Championships to date. In addition to being the current world champion, it is ranked first on the INF World Rankings. Australia beat the Silver Ferns to win the World Youth Netball Championships in July 2009 in the Cook Islands. Australia also has a men's national team. It has competed in the 2009 and 2011 International Challenge Men's and Mixed Netball Tournament.

== India ==
Women started playing netball in India as early as 1926. The Sports Authority of India and the Government of India have provided much funding with the goal of improving the performance of the country's youth national team. India had a national team compete in the fifth Asian Netball Championship in Colombo, Sri Lanka in 2001. National team captains include Prachi Tehlan, who captained the side that competed in the 2010 Commonwealth Games in Delhi. Some of the important netball competitions held in India include the 2010 Commonwealth Games, and the 7th Asian Youth Netball Championship, held from 3 to 10 July 2010, at the Thyagaraj Stadium. Some of the top performances for the India national netball team include coming in sixth place at the 2010 Nations Cup and coming in fourth at the 2010 Asian Youth Netball Championship.

== Japan ==
Japan team competed in Asian Netball Championships for 5 times.

== Malaysia ==
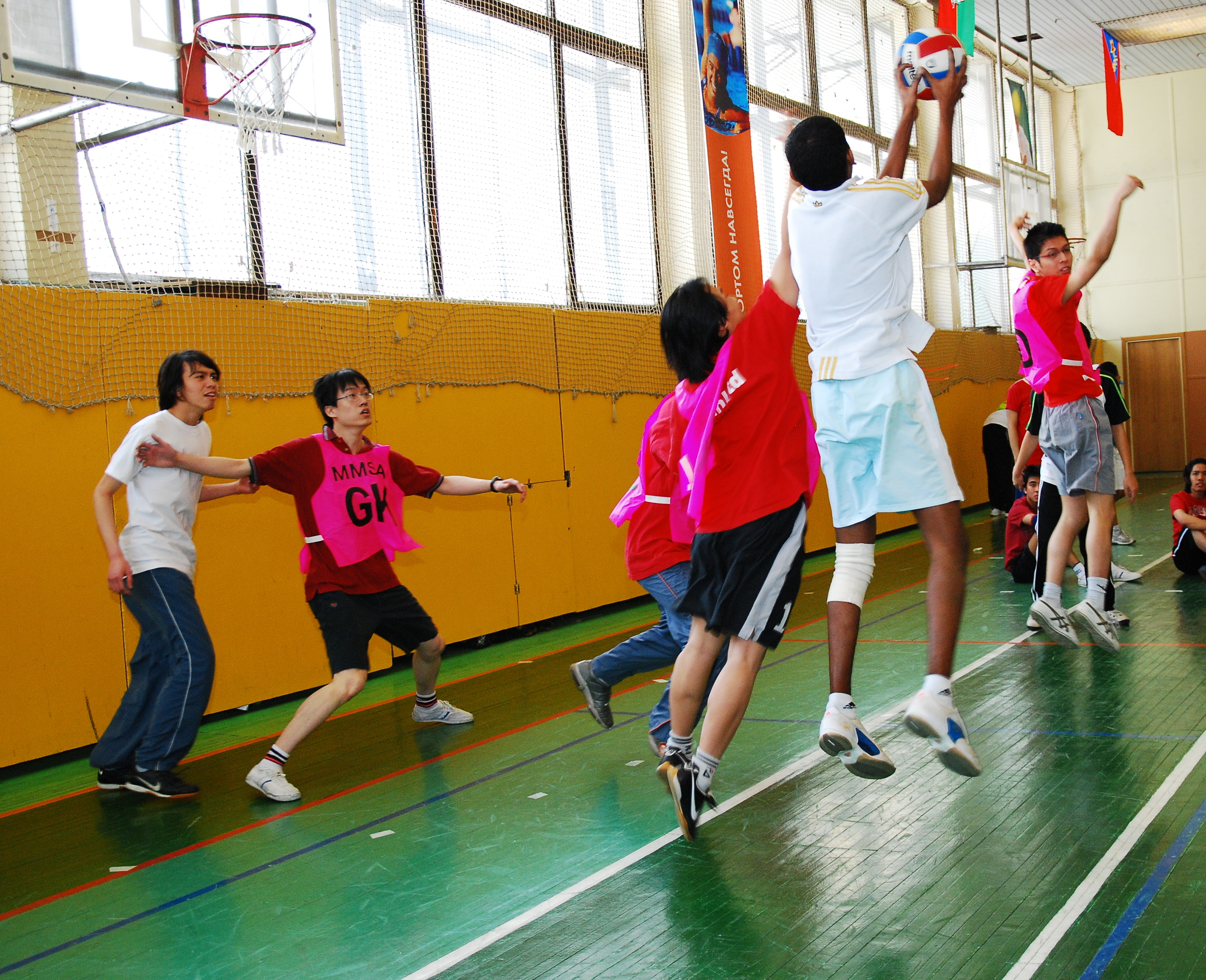
Men's Interbatch Games 2009 RMSA in Malaysia.

Netball is the most popular women's sport in Malaysia. The national organisation, Malaysian Netball Association, was created in 1978. The sport is part of the national curriculum beginning at year 3. Netball is promoted at the Sport Carnival for All (KESUMA). In 1998, 113 districts held netball competitions. That year, there were 1,718 registered netball teams in the country. In 2001, netball was sufficiently popular in South East Asia for it to be included in the 21st Southeast Asian Games in Kuala Lumpur. Malaysia had a national team compete in the fifth Asian Netball Championship in Colombo in 2001. Malaysia also competed in the 7th Asian Youth Netball Championship in India in 2010. Petronas, the national oil company, has been a major sponsor of netball in the country. This type of sponsorship was encouraged by the government as part of the Rakan Sukan programme. As of August 2016, the women's national team was ranked number nineteenth in the world. Following the appointment of a new coach, Tracey Robinson, they won the Asian Championships in 2016 and followed that up with South East Asian Games gold medal win in 2017.

== Singapore ==
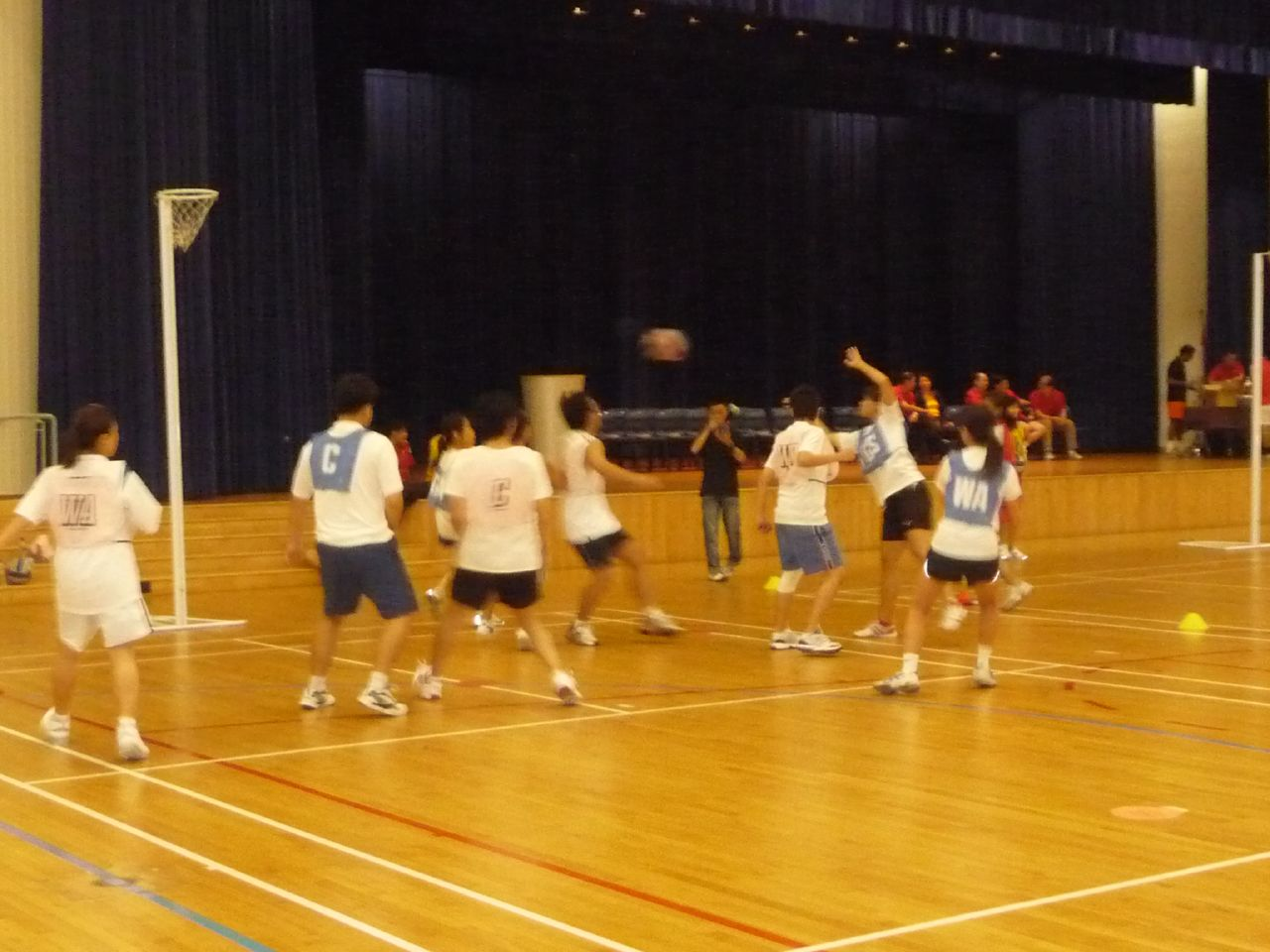
Mixed gender netball game played in Singapore.

Netball Singapore is the official governing body for the sport in Singapore. It was created in 1962, with 63 registered clubs. There are 80,000 netball players in Singapore. There are several variations of netball played in the country, including beach netball. In Singapore, the SSC is responsible for maintaining 8 netball courts. Singapore has several national squads: Opens, 21 & Under, 19 & Under (Post School), 19 & Under (Schools), 17 & Under, and 14 & Under. The national team competed in its first major tournament in 1967 at the Netball World Championships. Singapore had a national team compete in the fifth Asian Netball Championship held in Colombo, Sri Lanka in 2001. Singapore competed in the 7th Asian Youth Netball Championship held in 2010 in India. In 2000, netball was sufficiently popular that the professional Netball Super League (NSL) was formed. The Netball Super League is a seven-week-long netball tournament developed to cater for elite players in Singapore. It was established and is governed by Netball Singapore and six teams compete. In 2004, the audience was big enough that the Netball Super League was broadcast on television. The Stingrays came in second in 2008 and first in the 2009 competition. The 2010 competition was won by the Malaysian Arowanas. As of August 2016, the women's national team was ranked number seventeenth in the world.

== Sri Lanka ==
Netball was first played in Sri Lanka in 1921. The first game was played by Ceylon Girl Guide Company at Kandy High School. The first interschool march was played between Kandy High School and Colombo Ladies College in February 1925. In 1927, netball was played at Government Training College for the first time. This helped spread the game around Sri Lanka. The game was being played at Methodist College Colombo and Bishop's College by the 1930s. By 1952, Sri Lankan clubs were playing Indian club sides. By 1952, Sri Lankan clubs were playing Indian club sides. In 1956, Sri Lanka played its first international match against Australia's national team in Sri Lanka. Sri Lanka took part in the 1960 netball meeting of Commonwealth countries to try to standardise the rules for the game. This meeting took place in Sri Lanka. In 1972, the Netball Federation of Sri Lanka was created. In 1983, Netball Federation of Sri Lanka was dissolved by the government. Sri Lanka had a national team compete in the fifth Asian Netball Championship held in Colombo, Sri Lanka in 2001. Sri Lanka competed in the 7th Asian Youth Netball Championship held in 2010 in India. As of August 2016, the women's national team was ranked number twenty-seven in the world.

== National teams ==
Asia Netball currently has of 18 full members and two associate members

Full Members

| Team | Association |
|---|---|
| Australia | Netball Australia |
| Brunei | Brunei Netball Association |
| Chinese Taipei | Chinese Taipei Netball Association |
| Hong Kong | Netball Hong Kong China |
| India | Netball Federation of India |
| Malaysia | Malaysian Netball Association |
| Maldives | Netball Association of the Maldives |
| Pakistan | Pakistan Netball Federation |
| Philippines | Philippine Netball Federation |
| Saudi Arabia | Saudi Netball |
| Singapore | Netball Singapore |
| Sri Lanka | Netball Federation of Sri Lanka |
| Thailand | Netball Thailand Association |

Associate Members

| Team | Association |
|---|---|
| Bahrain | Bahrain Netball |
| Bangladesh | Bangladesh Netball Association |
| Japan | Japan Netball Association |
| Nepal | Nepal Netball |

Other netball nations

| Team | Association |
|---|---|
| Afghanistan | |
| Iran | |
| Indonesia | |
| Mongolia | |
| Myanmar | |
| Vietnam | |

== Bibliography ==
- International Federation of Netball Associations (15 June 2008). "History of Netball". Archived from the original on 6 March 2011.
- International Federation of Netball Associations (21 January 2011a). "Current World Rankings". Archived from the original on 19 May 2011.
