= Netball at the SEA Games =

- Most recent season or competition: Netball at the 2025 SEA Games
- Sport: Netball
- Founded: 2001; 25 years ago
- First season: 2001
- No. of teams: 5 teams (2025)
- Most recent champion: Malaysia (4th title)
- Most titles: Malaysia (4 titles)

Netball is among the sports occasionally contested at the Southeast Asian Games. First held in 2001, the sport has been held in three more editions in 2015, 2017, and 2019.

== History ==
Netball was first introduced at 2001 Southeast Asian Games in Kuala Lumpur, Malaysia. Although efforts to include the sport dates back in 1996, when netball was named as a Category 3 sport by the Southeast Asian Games Federation. Singapore lobbied for the inclusion of netball as early as the 1997 edition which was hosted by Indonesia.

It was staged three more times in the 2015, 2017, and 2019 with all finals contested between Malaysia and Singapore.

Netball will be held again at the 2025 SEA Games.

== All-time medal table ==
Updated after the 2025 Southeast Asian Games

Rank	Nation	Gold	Silver	Bronze	Total
1	Malaysia (MAS)	4	1	0	5
2	Singapore (SIN)	1	4	0	5
3	Thailand (THA)	0	0	5	5
4	Brunei (BRU)	0	0	4	4
5	Philippines (PHI)	0	0	1	1
Totals (5 entries)		5	5	10	20

== Medal winners ==
Year	Hosts	Medallists			Num. teams
Year	Hosts	Gold	Silver	Bronze	Num. teams
2001	Malaysia	Malaysia	Singapore	Thailand	3
2003–2013	Netball not contested				
2015	Singapore	Singapore	Malaysia	Thailand; Brunei	6
2017	Malaysia	Malaysia	Singapore	Thailand; Brunei	5
2019	Philippines	Malaysia	Singapore	Thailand; Brunei	5
2021–2023	Netball not contested				
2025	Thailand	Malaysia	Singapore	Thailand; Philippines	5

== Participating nations ==
Team	2001 (Malaysia)	2015 (Singapore)	2017 (Malaysia)	2019 (Philippines)	2025 (Thailand)
Brunei		3rd	3rd	3rd	5th
Malaysia	1st	2nd	1st	1st	1st
Myanmar	WD	5th			
Philippines		6th	5th	5th	3rd
Singapore	2nd	1st	2nd	2nd	2nd
Thailand	3rd	3rd	3rd	3rd	3rd
Nations	3	6	5	5	5
