= 2005 Asian Netball Championships =

Tournament details
- Host country: Singapore
- Dates: 3–10 September 2005
- Teams: 7

Final positions
- Champions: Singapore (1st title)
- Runners-up: Malaysia
- Third place: Sri Lanka

The 2005 Asian Netball Championship was the sixth edition of the Asian Netball Championship, a quadrennial Asian netball championship co-ordinated by the Asian Federation of Netball Associations (AIFNA), inaugurated in 1985. This tournament was also part of qualification for the 2007 World Netball Championships being held in New Zealand.

Seven nations were split into two groups with one being a group of three and the other a group of four. The top two teams from each group qualified to the knockout stage where the winners of the semi-finals qualifying for the World Cup. Singapore would take out their first Asian Championship defeating Malaysia 53–39.

== Preliminary round ==
=== Group A ===
Pos	Team	Pld	W	D	L	GF	GA	GD	Pts
1	Sri Lanka	2	2	0	0	129	60	69	4
2	Thailand	2	1	0	1	87	108	−21	2
3	Hong Kong	2	0	0	2	61	109	−48	0

September	Sri Lanka	69–38	Thailand

5 September	Sri Lanka	60–22	Hong Kong

September	Thailand	49–39	Hong Kong

=== Group B ===
Pos	Team	Pld	W	D	L	GF	GA	GD	Pts
1	Singapore	3	3	0	0	210	70	140	6
2	Malaysia	3	2	0	1	200	92	108	4
3	Maldives	3	1	0	2	81	162	−81	2
4	India	3	0	0	3	51	218	−167	0

3 September	Singapore	96–8	India

4 September	Singapore	59–18	Maldives

4 September	Malaysia	80–16	India

5 September	Malaysia	76–21	Maldives

6 September	Singapore	55–44	Malaysia

6 September	Maldives	42–27	India

== Classification matches ==
=== 5th place match ===
September	Maldives	bt	Hong Kong

== Knockout stage ==
Semi-finals
8 September
Malaysia	63
Sri Lanka	56
8 September
Singapore	64
Thailand	37

Final
10 September
Malaysia	39
Singapore	53
Bronze medal match
10 September
Sri Lanka	81
Thailand	36

== Final standings ==
Place	Nation
Gold	Singapore
Silver	Malaysia
Bronze	Sri Lanka
4	Thailand
5	Maldives
6	Hong Kong
7	India
