= Netball at the 2025 SEA Games =

- Nations: 5

The netball competition at the 2025 SEA Games in Thailand will be held from 12 to 17 December 2025 at Chulalongkorn University Chantareeyong Arena in Bangkok.

== Results ==
- All times are Indochina Time (UTC+09:00)

=== Preliminary round ===
Pos	Team	Pld	W	D	L	GF	GA	GD	Pts	Qualification
1	Singapore	4	4	0	0	286	148	+138	8	Final
2	Malaysia	4	3	0	1	248	183	+65	6	Final
3	Thailand (H)	4	2	0	2	235	205	+30	4	Bronze medal
4	Philippines	4	1	0	3	147	234	−87	2	Bronze medal
5	Brunei	4	0	0	4	141	287	−146	0	

Updated to match(es) played on 16 December 2025. Source: 2025 SEA Games
(H) Hosts

12 December 2025; 15:00	Report	Brunei	37–72	Thailand	Chantana Yingyong Stadium, Bangkok
12 December 2025; 15:00	Report	Scoring by quarter: 12–22, 7–19, 6–20, 12–12			Chantana Yingyong Stadium, Bangkok

12 December 2025; 17:00	Report	Philippines	22–70	Singapore	Chantana Yingyong Stadium, Bangkok
12 December 2025; 17:00	Report	Scoring by quarter: 2–20, 8–17, 8–14, 4–19			Chantana Yingyong Stadium, Bangkok

13 December 2025; 15:00	Report	Philippines	34–64	Thailand	Chantana Yingyong Stadium, Bangkok
13 December 2025; 15:00	Report	Scoring by quarter: 11–15, 10–16, 6–18, 7–15			Chantana Yingyong Stadium, Bangkok

13 December 2025; 17:00	Report	Brunei	33–75	Malaysia	Chantana Yingyong Stadium, Bangkok
13 December 2025; 17:00	Report	Scoring by quarter: 14–10, 21–9, 16–12, 18–16			Chantana Yingyong Stadium, Bangkok

14 December 2025; 15:00	Report	Singapore	69–47	Thailand	Chantana Yingyong Stadium, Bangkok
14 December 2025; 15:00	Report	Scoring by quarter: 14–10, 21–9, 16–12, 18–16			Chantana Yingyong Stadium, Bangkok

14 December 2025; 17:00	Report	Philippines	40–52	Malaysia	Chantana Yingyong Stadium, Bangkok
14 December 2025; 17:00	Report	Scoring by quarter: 7–16, 9–15, 12–10, 12–11			Chantana Yingyong Stadium, Bangkok

15 December 2025; 15:00	Report	Malaysia	56–58	Singapore	Chantana Yingyong Stadium, Bangkok
15 December 2025; 15:00	Report	Scoring by quarter: 15–12, 15–16, 13–13, 13–17			Chantana Yingyong Stadium, Bangkok

15 December 2025; 17:00	Report	Brunei	48–51	Philippines	Chantana Yingyong Stadium, Bangkok
15 December 2025; 17:00	Report	Scoring by quarter: 17–10, 9–14, 12–11, 10–16			Chantana Yingyong Stadium, Bangkok

16 December 2025; 15:00	Report	Malaysia	65–52	Thailand	Chantana Yingyong Stadium, Bangkok
16 December 2025; 15:00	Report	Scoring by quarter: 15–13, 11–13, 19–12, 20–14			Chantana Yingyong Stadium, Bangkok

16 December 2025; 17:00	Report	Brunei	23–89	Singapore	Chantana Yingyong Stadium, Bangkok
16 December 2025; 17:00	Report	Scoring by quarter: 9–19, 4–24, 5–25, 5–21			Chantana Yingyong Stadium, Bangkok

=== Final ===
17 December 2025; 15.00	Report	Singapore	49-52	Malaysia	Chantana Yingyong Stadium, Bangkok
17 December 2025; 15.00	Report	Scoring by quarter: 13-12, 15-10, 10-16, 11-14			Chantana Yingyong Stadium, Bangkok
