= 2015 Asian Youth Netball Championship =

Tournament details
- Host country: Hong Kong
- Dates: 14–20 December 2015
- Teams: 12

Final positions
- Champions: Sri Lanka
- Runners-up: Malaysia
- Third place: Singapore

The 2015 Asian Youth Netball Championship was the 9th edition of the tournament. The tournament was being played in Macpherson Stadium at Mong Kok, Hong Kong from 14 December to 20 December with twelve Asian national netball teams.

Sri Lanka defeated Malaysia 53–48 in the final to win the championship.

== Teams ==
Group A	Group B	Group C	Group D
Malaysia	Sri Lanka	Singapore	Hong Kong
Maldives	India	Brunei	Thailand
Japan	Chinese Taipei	UAE	Pakistan

== Preliminary round ==
All times are in Hong Kong Standard Time (UTC+08:00).

Key: Trophy Plate Bowl

=== Group A1 ===
Team	P	W	L	GF	GA	Pts
Malaysia	2	2	0	166	43	4
Japan	2	1	1	78	112	2
Maldives	2	0	2	58	147	0

14 Dec 2015
Malaysia	96–16	Maldives
15 Dec 2015
Maldives	42–51	Japan
16 Dec 2015
Malaysia	70–27	Japan

=== Group B1 ===
Team	P	W	L	GF	GA	Pts
Sri Lanka	2	2	0	195	42	4
Chinese Taipei	2	1	1	98	129	2
India	2	0	2	46	168	0

14 Dec 2015
Sri Lanka	102–10	India
15 Dec 2015
Chinese Taipei	66–36	India
16 Dec 2015
Chinese Taipei	32–93	Sri Lanka

=== Group C1 ===
Team	P	W	L	GF	GA	Pts
Singapore	2	2	0	151	36	4
Brunei	2	1	1	87	78	2
UAE	2	0	2	35	159	0

14 Dec 2015
Singapore	55–24	Brunei
15 Dec 2015
Brunei	63–23	UAE
16 Dec 2015
Singapore	96–12	UAE

=== Group D1 ===
Team	P	W	L	GF	GA	Pts
Hong Kong	2	2	0	133	39	4
Thailand	2	1	1	90	56	2
Pakistan	2	0	2	21	149	0

14 Dec 2015
Hong Kong	92–6	Pakistan
15 Dec 2015
Hong Kong	41–33	Thailand
16 Dec 2015
Thailand	57–15	Pakistan

== Second round ==
All times are in Hong Kong Standard Time (UTC+08:00).

=== Trophy ===
Team	P	W	L	GF	GA	Pts
Sri Lanka	3	3	0	205	146	6
Malaysia	3	2	1	169	145	4
Singapore	3	1	2	165	151	2
Hong Kong	3	0	3	104	201	0

17 Dec 2015
Singapore	64–26	Hong Kong
17 Dec 2015
Malaysia	48–64	Sri Lanka
18 Dec 2015
Sri Lanka	69–56	Singapore
18 Dec 2015
Malaysia	65–36	Hong Kong
19 Dec 2015
Singapore	45–56	Malaysia
19 Dec 2015
Hong Kong	42–72	Sri Lanka

=== Plate ===
Team	P	W	L	GF	GA	Pts
Brunei	3	3	0	147	116	6
Thailand	3	2	1	152	107	4
Chinese Taipei	3	1	2	115	150	2
Japan	3	0	3	105	146	0

17 Dec 2015
Brunei	43–39	Thailand
17 Dec 2015
Japan	39–40	Chinese Taipei
18 Dec 2015
Chinese Taipei	37–50	Brunei
18 Dec 2015
Japan	26–52	Thailand
19 Dec 2015
Brunei	54–40	Japan
19 Dec 2015
Thailand	61–38	Chinese Taipei

=== Bowl ===
Team	P	W	L	GF	GA	Pts
UAE	3	3	0	128	103	6
India	3	2	1	150	129	4
Maldives	3	2	1	136	124	4
Pakistan	3	0	3	96	154	0

17 Dec 2015
UAE	44–24	Pakistan
17 Dec 2015
Maldives	47–50	India
18 Dec 2015
India	44–45	UAE
18 Dec 2015
Maldives	54–35	Pakistan
19 Dec 2015
UAE	39–35	Maldives
19 Dec 2015
Pakistan	37–56	India

== Final and playoffs ==
=== Seventh and eighth place ===
20 December 2015; 10:00 HKT	Chinese Taipei	40–41	Japan

=== Fifth and sixth place ===
20 December 2015; 12:00 HKT	Brunei	34–38	Thailand

=== Third and fourth place ===
20 December 2015; 14:00 HKT	Singapore	42–28	Hong Kong

=== Final ===
20 December 2015; 16:00 HKT	Sri Lanka	53–48	Malaysia
