= 2024 Asian Netball Championships =

Netball championship

2024 Asian Netball Championship
Tournament details
- Host country: India
- Venue(s): Koramangala Indoor Stadium, Bengaluru
- Dates: 18–27 October 2024
- Teams: 14

Final positions
- Champions: Singapore
- Runners-up: Sri Lanka

The 2024 Asian Netball Championship was the 13th edition of the Asian Netball Championships, held in India from 18 October to 27 October 2024, with 14 teams taking part for the first time. Singapore won the tournament defeating Sri Lanka with a scoreline 67–64 in a closely fought final to claim their fourth Asian Netball Championship. It is their first Asian title since 2014.

This tournament was only the second instance in the competition's history where India was given the hosting rights and it was the first Asian Netball Championship to be held in India since 1989. Sri Lanka were the current defending champions of the tournament having triumphed during the 2022 edition defeating Singapore. Koramangala Indoor Stadium in Bengaluru was approved as the only main venue to host all of the scheduled matches including the knockout stages and the final. The opening ceremony of the competition kickstarted on 17 October 2024. Despite the skirmishes, geopolitical tensions and diplomatic standoff between India and Pakistan, Pakistan Sports Board (PSB) issued a no-objection certificate (NOC) allowing the Pakistani national netball team to compete at the 2024 Asian Netball Championship in India. Approval for participation of the Pakistan national netball team in the tournament was refused by Indian authorities owing to national security concerns and political turmoil between the two nations.

The tournament format, following a single round-robin phase, the top two teams from each group would set to advance all the way to the semi-finals, while the rest of the teams were slated to compete in final ranking matches to determine placements from fifth to fourteenth. The semis and the initial placement games were scheduled for 26 October 2024, followed by the gold and bronze medal matches, along with final classification contests on 27 October 2024.

== Participating teams ==
Fourteen teams participated in the 2024 Asian Netball Championship including Saudi Arabia which made its debut in the tournament.

- Bahrain
- Brunei
- Chinese Taipei
- Hong Kong
- India (host)
- Iraq
- Japan
- Malaysia
- Maldives
- ~~Pakistan~~ (withdrew; entry denied)
- Philippines
- Saudi Arabia
- Sri Lanka
- Thailand

== Preliminary round ==
=== Group A ===
Team	Pld	W	D	L	GF	GA	GD	Points
Sri Lanka	6	6	0	0	509	168	+341	12
Malaysia	6	5	0	1	421	180	+241	10
Philippines	6	4	0	2	328	272	+56	8
Maldives	6	3	0	4	298	250	+48	6
India	6	2	0	5	269	307	-38	4
Japan	6	1	0	5	142	352	-210	2
Saudi Arabia	6	0	0	6	68	470	-402	0

18 October 2024	Report	India	55 – 22	Japan

18 October 2024	Report	Philippines	42 – 73	Sri Lanka

18 October 2024	Saudi Arabia	14 – 74	Maldives

19 October 2024	Philippines	50 – 43	India

19 October 2024	Malaysia	82 – 8	Japan

19 October 2024	Report	Sri Lanka	118 – 5	Saudi Arabia

20 October 2024	Malaysia	64 – 28	Maldives

20 October 2024	Japan	39 – 17	Saudi Arabia

20 October 2024	Report	Sri Lanka	81 – 31	India

21 October 2024	Malaysia	87 – 3	Saudi Arabia

21 October 2024	Maldives	54 – 48	India

22 October 2024	Report	Sri Lanka	85 – 18	Japan

22 October 2024	Philippines	56 – 48	Maldives

22 October 2024	Malaysia	81 – 23	India

23 October 2024	Maldives	62 – 24	Japan

23 October 2024	Philippines	83 – 10	Saudi Arabia

23 October 2024	Report	Sri Lanka	72 – 40	Malaysia

24 October 2024	Philippines	51 – 31	Japan

25 October 2024	India	69 – 19	Saudi Arabia

25 October 2024	Malaysia	67 – 46	Philippines

26 October 2024	Report	Sri Lanka	80 – 32	Maldives

=== Group B ===
Team	Pld	W	D	L	GF	GA	GD	Points
Singapore	6	6	0	0	0	0	0	12
Hong Kong	6	5	0	1	0	0	0	10
Thailand	6	4	0	2	0	0	0	8
Brunei	6	3	0	3	0	0	0	6
Chinese Taipei	6	2	0	4	0	0	0	4
Bahrain	6	1	0	5	0	0	0	2
Iraq	6	0	0	6	69	561	-492	0

18 October 2024	Hong Kong	69 – 11	Chinese Taipei

18 October 2024	Iraq	3 – 122	Singapore

18 October 2024	Thailand	68 – 45	Brunei

19 October 2024	Chinese Taipei	35 – 29	Bahrain

19 October 2024	Hong Kong	67 – 40	Brunei

19 October 2024	Thailand	89 – 6	Iraq

20 October 2024	Brunei	66 – 20	Chinese Taipei

20 October 2024	Hong Kong	127 – 7	Iraq

20 October 2024	Singapore	107 – 10	Bahrain

21 October 2024	Singapore	94 – 27	Brunei

21 October 2024	Thailand	86 – 18	Bahrain

22 October 2024	Hong Kong	98 – 10	Bahrain

22 October 2024	Brunei	106 – 14	Iraq

22 October 2024	Singapore	78 – 42	Thailand

23 October 2024	Brunei	88 – 28	Bahrain

23 October 2024	Thailand	70 – 24	Chinese Taipei

23 October 2024	Singapore	67 – 24	Hong Kong

24 October 2024	Chinese Taipei	54 – 13	Iraq

25 October 2024	Singapore	92 – 17	Chinese Taipei

26 October 2024	Bahrain	63 – 26	Iraq

26 October 2024	Hong Kong	62 – 60	Thailand

=== Semi-finals ===
Sri Lanka and Malaysia from Group A progressed and advanced to the semi-finals of the tournament after topping their group. Singapore and Hong Kong from Group B advanced to the semi-finals after topping their group.

26 October 2024	Report	Sri Lanka	71 – 47	Hong Kong

26 October 2024	Report	Singapore	54 – 46	Malaysia

=== Final ===
27 October 2024	Report	Singapore	67 – 64	Sri Lanka

Singapore dominated the proceedings early in the final after making inroads by gaining an early advantage in the opening quarter by holding the possession during the opening minutes of the first quarter. Singapore's goal shooter Lee Pei Shan, who had towering height of 1.86m held the possession of the ball often finding the net and she contributed 12 goals in the opening quarter, ending up 17–12 in Singapore's favour. Sri Lanka gained momentum in the next two quarters with their leading goal shooter Thishala Algama carried from where she left off by scoring goals and it eventually helped to pile up consecutive 15-11 scores for Sri Lanka to turn the tide and lead Singapore in the second and third quarters of the final with a scoreline of 42–39. At one stage, Sri Lanka were poised to win the final after having gained a significant advantage which forced the match to be stretched for a scoreline of 45–41 with only 10 minutes remaining in regulation time. The turning point of the match came when Sri Lankan shooter Thishala Algama was benched during the latter stages of the final which changed the momentum back in Singapore's favour. Singapore vice-captain Toh Kai Wei began to find her range and mojo, capitalizing on the absence of her opposite number Algama and her scoring prowess literally prompted a slight recovery for Singapore who overcame the deficit to lead Sri Lanka with a scoreline of 52–51 by the barest of all margins in the final few minutes. The match went down to the wire and into overtime as Sri Lanka's Rashmi Perera sent it into the two extra periods. Toh Kai Wei (11 goals) and Amandeep (4 goals) managed to pull things back in Singapore's favour and Singapore edged past Sri Lanka with a scoreline 15–12 in overtime to clinch the 2024 Asian Netball Championship.

== Final placings ==
Place	Country
Gold	Singapore
Silver	Sri Lanka
Bronze	Malaysia
4	Hong Kong
5	Thailand
6	Philippines
7	Brunei
8	Maldives
9	India
10	Chinese Taipei
11	Japan
12	Bahrain
13	Saudi Arabia
14	Iraq

== Squads ==
=== Sri Lanka ===
In September 2024, Selection Committee of the Netball Federation of Sri Lanka (NFSL) announced the 12-member squad for the 2024 Asian Netball Championship. A final selection trial was held at the University of Kelaniya Indoor Stadium to pick the players to represent Sri Lanka at the tournament. The final touring squad and lineup was submitted for Sports Ministry to get prior approval through the National Selection Committee in order to proceed further for the preparation sessions with the squad members ahead of the tournament proper. It was also later reported that there was an administration chaos within Sri Lankan Netball with the advent of Netball Federation of Sri Lanka being dissolved due to power tussles and political interference. Due to the dissolving of Netball Federation of Sri Lanka, the organizing of the international matches were hampered for the Sri Lankan players except for national trials.

The Sri Lankan team travelled to India on 15 October 2024, nearly three days prior to the start of the tournament. Sri Lankan Prime Minister Harini Amarasuriya met the Sri Lankan contingent prior to their scheduled departure.

- Dulangi Wannithilake (Captain)
- Gayanjali Amarawansa
- Gayani Dissanayake
- Thishala Algama
- Hasitha Mendis
- Rashmi Perera
- Shanika Perera
- Gayathri Kaushalya
- Malmi Hettiarachchi
- Suseema Bandara
- Sachini Rodrigo
- Chalani Neesha

=== India ===
Hosts India announced and finalised a 12-member squad. In September 2024, 41st edition of the Indian Netball Nationals was held in Haryana and Rajasthan team secured the silver medal. Pooja Chopra and Laxmi Kanwar who were an integral part of the Rajasthan side were subsequently included in the Indian squad for the 2024 Asian Netball Championship, based on their clinical performances at the Netball Nationals.

- Surabhi BR (Captain)
- Navdeep Kaur,
- Aiswarya PK
- Shilpa A
- Laxmi Kanwar
- Versha
- Sonam Sharma
- Vaishnavi M
- Sharayu Pravin Jagtap
- Geetanjali Bagga
- Mahi
- Pooja Chopra

== Controversy ==
Indian authorities denied visa applications of Pakistan national netball players and as a result, Pakistan could not participate in the tournament. It was revealed that Pakistan prepared well ahead of the tournament, but Pakistan was eventually left out of the tournament in India, and the championship draw was also released without the inclusion of Pakistan. Pakistan Netball Federation initially even chose a tentative squad members as well as touring officials and Pakistan Netball Federation submitted applications for Indian visas considering the tentatively selected members prior to their participation at the tournament. It was also reported that according to some sources, there was a possibility and likelihood of picking British-Pakistani athletes who were speculated to be in firm contention for inclusion in the squad.
