= Philippines national netball team =

Philippines
- Nickname(s): Siklab Pilipinas
- Association: Netball Philippines
- Confederation: Netball Asia
- Head coach: Angelina Fedillaga
- Captain: Leanne Espina
- Top scorer: Ana Thea Cenarosa (85)
- World ranking: N/A
Team colours

First international
- Philippines 22–62 Thailand; Singapore, May 31, 2015

Largest win
- Philippines 83–10 Saudi Arabia; Bangalore, India, October 23, 2024

Largest defeat
- Malaysia 112–11 Philippines; Singapore, June 1, 2015

The Philippines national netball team represents the Philippines in international netball competitions.

They made their international debut at the 2015 Southeast Asian Games.

== History ==
Netball Singapore has offered aid to the Philippines to organize a netball team for the 2015 Southeast Asian Games set to be hosted by Singapore. After visits from Netball Singapore and the Netball Asia in 2014, Netball Philippines was formed and a national team was organized. Netball Singapore hosted a training camp in Singapore for the Philippine national team in December 2014. Players who have played in volleyball and basketball teams in the country were called up to form the first national team.

The Philippines under English coach Fransien Howarth entered the 2015 SEA Games in Singapore, their first tournament with modest expectations. They lost their first match against Thailand, with the scoreline of 22–62, in their opener on May 31, 2015. They also experienced a 112–11 defeat at the hands of the national team of Malaysia on June 1. Then they lost to Myanmar with the scoreline of 62–22.

The Philippine Sports Commission (PSC) allowed the national team to participate at the 2017 SEA Games in Kuala Lumpur, Malaysia despite the team's dismal performance in the previous edition. The handlers of the national team's sole reason given to the PSC was that they are still a "developmental team". The team by this time is now mentored by Angelina Fedillaga.

They took part in the 2019 SEA Games, which was hosted at home. They continued to drawing basketball players into the squad and taking advantage of Singaporean assistance.

== Players ==
=== Previous ===
Ten players were selected to participate at the 2015 Southeast Asian Games.

Philippines national netball team
| Player | Position | Height (cm) |
| Teresa Angeline Aquino | GK | 174 |
| Remia Buenacosa | GD, C | 167 |
| Danielle Michiko Castaneda | GS, GD | 174 |
| Ana Thea Cenarosa | GA | 179 |
| Maricar Convencido | WA | 169 |
| Michelle Datuin | GK | 170 |
| Leanne Espina (captain) | WA, GS | 167 |
| Loraine Angela Lim | C, WA | 163 |
| Kristine Marie Teo | WD | 168 |
| Mary Anne Jenelle Yabut | C | 168 |

== Coaching staff ==
- Head coach: (Philippines) Angelina Fedillaga
- Assistant coach:
  - (Singapore) Loo Yi Lin Jolynn

== Competitive history ==
Asian Netball Championships
| Year | Competition | Location | Placing |
|---|---|---|---|
| 2018 | 2018 Asian Netball Championships | Singapore | 9th |
| 2022 | 2022 Asian Netball Championships | Singapore | 5th |
| 2024 | 2024 Asian Netball Championships | Bengaluru, India | 6th |
Asian Indoor and Martial Arts Games
| Year | Competition | Location | Placing |
| — | 2021 Asian Indoor and Martial Arts Games | Bangkok and Chonburi, Thailand | Qualified, but cancelled |
Southeast Asian Games
| Year | Competition | Location | Placing |
| 2015 | 2015 Southeast Asian Games | Singapore | 6th |
| 2017 | 2017 Southeast Asian Games | Kuala Lumpur, Malaysia | 5th |
| 2019 | 2019 Southeast Asian Games | Philippines | 5th |
| 2025 | 2025 Southeast Asian Games | Thailand | 4th |
Other tournaments
| Year | Competition | Location | Placing |
| 2022 | International Netball Event | Jeonju, South Korea | 2nd |

== Head coaches ==
| Coach | Years |
|---|---|
| (England) Fransien Howarth | 2015 |
| (Philippines) Angelina Fedillaga | 2017–present |
