= Ana Thea Cenarosa =

Filipino netballer (born 1992)

- Born: February 26, 1992 (age 34)
- Height: 179 cm (5 ft 10 1/2 in)
- Sports career
- National team: Philippines (netball)
- Years active: 2015– (netball)
- Sport: Netball, basketball (5x5 and 3x3)
- Position: Goal attacker (netball)
- College team: NU Lady Bulldogs (basketball)
- Collegiate league: UAAP

Ana Thea Cenarosa (born February 26, 1992) is a Filipino netballer, former basketballer and beauty queen.

== Sporting career ==
=== Basketball ===
Prior to netball, Cenaros played as a basketball player in the collegiate level. She played for the National University (NU) Lady Bulldogs at the UAAP. She was also a 3x3 basketball player competing for Amazing in the 2021 WNBL 3x3

=== Netball ===
Cenarosa who plays as a goal attacker for the Philippines national netball team. She was part of the Philippines team in both the 2015 and 2017 Southeast Asian Games, captaining the team in the latter.

Tournaments	Place
2015 SEA Games	6th
2017 SEA Games	6th
2022 Asian Netball Championships	5th

== Pageantry ==
Cenarosa has also competed in beauty pageants and is noted for finishing as a runner up in the Miss Philippines Earth 2019.

She was also a candidate in the Binibining Pilipinas 2020 pageant as a representative of Pototan, Iloilo. Her advocacy was women's sports. The pageant would be postponed and renamed as Binibining Pilipinas 2021 due to the COVID-19 pandemic.. However she withdrew without taking part in the final night due to new age requirements caused by the delay .
