= Fransien Howarth =

British netball coach

Personal information
- Born: 1985 or 1986 (age 40–41) England
- Occupations: Teacher, Netball coach

Netball career
Coaching career
- Years: Team
- 2015: Philippines

Fransien Howarth (born 1985 or 1986) is a British netball coach who is mentoring the national netball team of the Philippines. Howarth led the Philippines at their first international stint at the 2015 Southeast Asian Games.

Howarth is also a physical education high school teacher at the International School Manila since 2013 and previously stayed in Bangkok, Thailand prior to her teaching career in Manila.

== Statistics ==
=== Coaching ===
As of 4 June 2015.

Nat	Team	from	to	Record				
Nat	Team	from	to	Games	Wins	Draws	Losses	Win %
(Philippines)	Philippines	2015	present	5	0	0	5	0.00
Total				5	0	0	5	0.00
