= Netball at the 2017 SEA Games =

- Venue: Juara Stadium
- Dates: 14–20 August 2017
- Nations: 5

Medalists
gold medal	Malaysia (MAS)
silver medal	Singapore (SGP)
bronze medal	Brunei (BRU)
bronze medal	Thailand (THA)

The netball competitions at the 2017 Southeast Asian Games in Kuala Lumpur were held from 14 to 20 August at Juara Stadium in Bukit Kiara.

== Competition schedule ==
The following was the competition schedule for the netball competitions:

P	Preliminaries	½	Semi-finals	F	Final

Mon 14	Tue 15	Wed 16	Thu 17	Fri 18	Sat 19	Sun 20
P	P	P	P	P	½	F

== Squads ==
Brunei (BRU)	Malaysia (MAS)	Philippines (PHI)	Singapore (SGP)	Thailand (THA)
Nurulain Abdul Hamid; Siti Marhayati Ahmad; Siti Nurul Nazihah; Athiyyah As'ad; Dayangku Khalisha; Nurafiqah Samat; Nur Syuhaidah Fahriyana; Dayangku Nur Amal; Nur Ady Elzza; Zuraidah; Dayangku Noor Nadziratul; Nur Hafizah	Karishma S. Loganathan; Norashikin Kamal Zaman; Pow Mei Foong; Yap Suo Kuen; Shandralelka Shanmugam; An Najwa Azizan; Siti Nor Farhana Mustafa; Izyan Syazana Mohd Wazir; Nur Fariha Abdul Razak; Nur Syafazliyana Mohd Ali; Noramirah Dayana Noor Azhar; Puah Pei San	Cathlyn Jane Seno; Ana Thea Cenarosa; Leanne Espina; Eliezza Dianne Ventura; Diana Doqueza; Anjelica Estacion; Teresa Angeline Aquino; Ana Theresa Codinera; Meilyn Guerra Ip; Eunice Krisma Ann Japone; Clarice Jasper Sup; Katryna Rose Domino	Charmaine Soh; Zhang Ailin; Kimberly Lim; Nurul Baizura; Vanessa Marie Lee; Aqilah Andin; Shina Teo; Jocelyn Ng; Chen Lili; Melody Teo; Parveen Nair; Toh Kai Wei	Khanittha Kangwonngan; Bunwilai Thongma; Pakladathanan Thiratananitiworachot; Paweena Kamwan; Thidaporn Sutthachip; Panita Rittirong; Kliawked Panchutturat; Daraporn Panchang; Pacharee Sangjan; Preeyaporn Gulsirirat; Sirima Samnaree; Rattiyakorn Buathong

== Results ==
- All times are Malaysia Standard Time (UTC+08:00)

=== Preliminary round ===
Pos	Team	Pld	W	D	L	GF	GA	GD	Pts	Qualification
1	Malaysia (H)	4	4	0	0	283	105	+178	8	Final round
2	Singapore	4	3	0	1	249	150	+99	6	Final round
3	Thailand	4	2	0	2	208	187	+21	4	Final round
4	Brunei	4	1	0	3	172	209	−37	2	Final round
5	Philippines	4	0	0	4	81	342	−261	0	

Updated to match(es) played on 18 August 2017. Source: KL2017 Official Website
(H) Hosts

14 August 2017; 15:15	Malaysia	73–30	Thailand
14 August 2017; 15:15	Scoring by quarter: 18–10, 17–5, 17–6, 21–9

14 August 2017; 17:30	Brunei	37–62	Singapore
14 August 2017; 17:30	Scoring by quarter: 7–15, 6–18, 12–12, 12–17

15 August 2017; 15:00	Philippines	16–86	Thailand
15 August 2017; 15:00	Scoring by quarter: 3–23, 7–23, 4–18, 2–22

15 August 2017; 17:15	Brunei	27–64	Malaysia
15 August 2017; 17:15	Scoring by quarter: 9–18, 7–11, 5–18, 6–17

16 August 2017; 15:00	Philippines	32–69	Brunei
16 August 2017; 15:00	Scoring by quarter: 5–16, 6–16, 10–18, 11–19

16 August 2017; 17:15	Singapore	37–50	Malaysia
16 August 2017; 17:15	Scoring by quarter: 11–14, 7–13, 8–10, 11–13

17 August 2017; 15:00	Singapore	91–22	Philippines
17 August 2017; 15:00	Scoring by quarter: 25–4, 18–6, 26–8, 22–4

17 August 2017; 17:15	Thailand	51–39	Brunei
17 August 2017; 17:15	Scoring by quarter: 15–12, 15–5, 9–11, 12–11

18 August 2017; 15:00	Malaysia	96–11	Philippines
18 August 2017; 15:00	Scoring by quarter: 26–2, 24–2, 25–3, 21–4

18 August 2017; 17:15	Thailand	41–59	Singapore
18 August 2017; 17:15	Scoring by quarter: 14–15, 8–15, 12–13, 7–16

=== Final round ===
Semi-finals
19 August – 10:30
Malaysia	70
Brunei	28
19 August – 12:45
Singapore	55
Thailand	43

Gold medal match
20 August – 15:00
Malaysia	65
Singapore	41

==== Semi-finals ====
19 August 2017; 10:30	Malaysia	70–28	Brunei
19 August 2017; 10:30	Scoring by quarter: 25–4, 14–8, 14–9, 17–7

19 August 2017; 12:45	Singapore	55–43	Thailand
19 August 2017; 12:45	Scoring by quarter: 13–9, 13–12, 15–9, 14–13

=== Gold medal match ===
20 August 2017; 15:00	Malaysia	65–41	Singapore
20 August 2017; 15:00	Scoring by quarter: 20–7, 16–5, 15–16, 14–13

== Medal summary ==
=== Medalists ===
Event	Gold	Silver	Bronze
Women	Malaysia (MAS)	Singapore (SGP)	Brunei (BRU)
Women	Malaysia (MAS)	Singapore (SGP)	Thailand (THA)
