= Philippine Netball Federation =

Governing body of netball

- Founded: 2014
- Region: Netball Asia
- President: Charlie Ho
- Women's coach: Angelina Fedillaga

Official website
- {{URL|example.com|optional display text}}
- (Philippines)

Philippine Netball Federation, Inc. is the governing body of netball in the Philippines. It was established in 2014, with assistance from Netball Singapore. Its first president and general secretary are Charlie Ho and Bea Gonzalez respectively. The sporting body organizes the national team which made their international debut at the 2015 Southeast Asian Games.

They gained full membership in World Netball in August 2021.

== See also ==
- Philippines national netball team
