= Asian Youth Netball Championship =

Biennial under-21 netball tournament

- Current season, competition or edition: 2025 Asian Youth Netball Championship
- Sport: Netball
- First season: 1994
- No. of teams: 11 (2019)
- Most recent champion: Malaysia (2019)
- Most titles: Malaysia (7 titles)

The Asian Youth Netball Championship is regarded as the pinnacle netball tournament for the under-21 age group in the Asian Region by Asia Netball. The Championship is a 7-day event held every 2 years in different countries across the region.

Malaysia are the current champions.

== Medals (1994-2023) ==
Rank	Nation	Gold	Silver	Bronze	Total
1	Malaysia (MAS)	7	2	1	10
2	Sri Lanka (SRI)	3	5	2	10
3	Singapore (SIN)	2	3	5	10
4	Hong Kong (HKG)	0	0	1	1
Totals (4 entries)		12	10	9	31

== Results ==
Year	Venue	Teams	Winner	Runner-up	Third place
1994	Hong Kong		Singapore
1998	India		Sri Lanka	Singapore	Malaysia
2002	Malaysia		Sri Lanka
2004	Sri Lanka	6	Malaysia	Sri Lanka
2006	India		Malaysia	Sri Lanka	Singapore
2008	Hong Kong	7	Malaysia	Sri Lanka	Singapore
2010	India	6	Malaysia	Sri Lanka	Singapore
2013	Brunei	10	Malaysia	Sri Lanka	Singapore
2015	Hong Kong	12	Sri Lanka	Malaysia	Singapore
2017	South Korea	10	Singapore	Malaysia	Hong Kong
2019	Japan	11	Malaysia	Singapore	Sri Lanka
2023	South Korea	11	Malaysia	Singapore	Sri Lanka

== See also ==
- Asian Netball Championships
