= Bahrain national netball team =

Bahrain
- Nickname(s): Bahrain Pearls
- Association: Netball Bahrain
- Confederation: Netball Asia
- Head coach: Maggie Testola
- Captain: Stacey Clarke

First international
- Chinese Taipei 35–29 Bahrain; Bengaluru, India, 19 October 2024

Largest win
- Bahrain 63–26 Iraq; Bengaluru, India, 26 October 2024

Largest defeat
- Singapore 107–10 Bahrain; Bengaluru, India, 20 October 2024

Bahrain national netball team represents the Bahrain in international netball competitions.

== History ==
Netball Bahrain was granted association status within Netball Asia in 2023.

The Bahrain national team made its international debut at the Asian Netball Championships in the 2024 edition in Bengaluru, India. While they lost to their first five opposition, they won their first ever game against Iraq.

== Competitive history ==
Asian Netball Championships
Year	Competition	Location	Placing
2022	2022 Asian Netball Championships	Singapore	Did not enter
2024	2024 Asian Netball Championships	Bengaluru, India	12th
