= Tilaka Jinadasa =

Sri Lankan athlete

Personal information
- Nationality: Sri Lankan
- Born: 15 March 1963 (age 63)

Sport
- Sport: Track and field
- Events: 100 metres hurdles 400 metres hurdles
Medal record
Women's athletics
Representing Sri Lanka
South Asian Games
Gold medal – first place	1987 Calcutta	100 m hurdles

Deshabandu Kosgamage Tilaka Dhammika Jinadasa (born 15 March 1963) is a Sri Lankan former track and field athlete and netballer, and a netball coach. As an athlete, she specialised in hurdles competing in the 100 metres hurdles and 400 metres hurdles events. After her career as an athlete, she coached the Sri Lankan netball team and helped them win the 2009 and 2018 Asian Championships, before resigning in 2020.

Jinadasa won gold at the 1987 South Asian Games in the same event. She held the Sri Lankan national record for the event at 14.38 seconds during that time. She competed in the 100 metres hurdles at the 1988 Summer Olympics.

Jinadasa also coached the Brunei netball team between 2011 and 2018.

She was awarded the title of Deshabandu by the President of Sri Lanka in the 1988 national honours for her contribution for sports.
