= Netball and the Olympic Movement =

- Highest governing body: World Netball

Presence
- Olympic: IOC-recognized federation, 1995; Never played at the Games

Netball has never been played at the Summer Olympics, but its federation World Netball has been recognized by the International Olympic Committee (IOC), since 1995 after a twenty-year period of lobbying. The netball community sees netball's absence at the Olympic Games as a hindrance to the global growth of the game, depriving it of media attention and funding. When the IOC recognized netball's federation, it opened up sources of funds that the global netball community had not been able to access before, including the IOC, national Olympic committees and sports organisations, and state and federal governments.

== Women's sport at the Olympics ==
We know we can't compete against football and rugby but to have more recognition and insight into the sport would be great

— Geva Mentor, England Goal Keeper (2011)

According to Dyer in 1982, exclusion of netball from the Summer Olympics is part of the historical pattern of the slow growth and gradual acceptance of women's sports. Women first competed in the 1900 Summer Olympics in only three sports: tennis, croquet and golf. Women's basketball has been played in the Summer Olympics since 1976. That year, rowing and handball were also opened to women. Women's cycling was excluded for many years despite having world championships organised by 1958. Field hockey, a sport included for men as early as 1908, was not open to competition by women until 1980. By the 1992 Summer Olympics in Barcelona, there were 159 medal events for men, but only 86 for women, and 12 for both men and women, and as late as 1996, 26 countries sent no women to the Olympics. There were still sports that excluded women at the 2000 Summer Olympics, such as boxing, wrestling and baseball. (Note: In 2012, women's boxing was added to the Olympic programme resulting in women's participation in all sports.) At the 2012 Summer Olympics, both men and women competed in 34 sports.

In 2018, the IOC adopted 25 recommendations from its Commission on Women in Sport. These recommendations seek to establish equal participation between men and women at the Olympic Games by implementing the same venue, equipment, competition rules and uniforms for both genders in all Olympic sports rather than adding women-only sports. At the 2012 Olympics, there were two sports for women only: synchronized swimming and rhythmic gymnastics. That netball is also played mostly by women is seen as a drawback. Netball does allow for mixed teams, but the Olympics did not include mixed sex team sports. (Note: While team mixed sex sports are not competed at the Olympics, some mixed sex events are included. They include equestrian sports, shooting and sailing where men and women compete against each other. In shooting and sailing, women were originally only allowed to compete in mixed sex events. Single sex events for these sports were not added until a later date. In 2012, mixed doubles tennis returned to the programme after an 88-year absence.) Rugby sevens and golf, primarily played by men, were chosen for inclusion in the 2016 Summer Olympics for both sexes ahead of netball.

The issue of male overrepresentation in terms of total number of sports and athletes is structural. In the United Kingdom, for example, more male athletes than female ones receive financial support. Sports officials often rationalise this uneven distribution by claiming that there are more opportunities for men to win at the highest level than there are for women. The importance of being part of the Summer Olympics is illustrated by softball, and the benefits the sport derived from its inclusion. This included additional media coverage, especially during Olympic years. Olympic recognition plays an important part in getting sponsorship for local competitions around the world and providing new opportunities for female netball players.

== Olympic recognition of the INF ==
Netball is an amazing sport and it was very sad for us for it not to be in the Olympic Games so it would be amazing if we could get it in next time round. It would be brilliant for the girls coming through to get that opportunity to play at the Olympics because it is the sporting pinnacle if you can achieve that goal.

— Tamsin Greenway, England wing attack (2011)

Efforts to gain Olympic recognition started in 1967, at the time when the International Netball Federation (INF) was founded as the "International Federation of Netball Associations". The Jamaican and Singaporean delegations present at the meeting suggested the newly created organisation become affiliated with the World Olympic Sports Council and try to get netball included on the Olympic programme. Opinions were initially split inside the newly formed organisation as to whether this was a goal worth striving for, but ultimately it was decided to work towards Olympic recognition. The federation's first application was rejected because it referred to the sport as women's basketball and the International Olympic Committee (IOC) said there could not be two different sports with the same name on the Olympic programme. This rejection was a driving factor for changing the name of the sport. There was tremendous resistance in Australia and New Zealand to this. IFNA made "major concessions" to both countries to persuade them to change the name of their national federations. In 1965, the IOC criteria required a sport must be played in at least 11 nations and the international body represented the sport must have at least 27 national organisations affiliated with it.

A second application was started in 1971 after the previous rejection which reflected the name change. While name changes and other International Olympic Committee suggestions were agreed upon as necessary to go forward, the integration of these changes into the Federation's constitution and governance strategy took over four years and the application languished as a result until 1979, when the IOC responded with a request for additional information on INF's finances and governance. The decision to provide additional information was deferred until 1979's Conference. The Jamaican representatives were frustrated with the slow process inside the organisation and tried to take steps to speed the process up inside IFNA. This included submitting proposals for organisational changes to address the most recent IOC feedback, addressing issues such as player drug testing, the selling of television and radio rights, and how to establish an Olympic draw among other points. Because of Jamaican influence, INF created a specific committee to work on the issue of addressing Olympic requirements, which was composed of New Zealanders Rena Straford, Lorna McOnchie and Anne Taylor. They were supposed to have these issues addressed by a meeting scheduled at the end of 1979. (Note: Concurrently to trying to gain Olympic recognition, the organisation was also seeking recognition from the Commonwealth Games.)

Delays happened because of the structure of INF and the required material was not ready for presenting before INF's Council until 1983. During this four-year waiting period, Jamaica and Bermuda continued to agitate for the Federation to speed the process along as attaining recognition would provide their region with additional funding and make it easier to grow the sport regionally. The second application was eventually rejected in 1983, with the IOC claiming the sport had "limited popularity". While netball was not able to gain Olympic recognition during this period, it did gain recognition from General Assembly of International Sports Federations. This allowed netball to be played at the World Games in 1985.

Because of the 1983 rejection, an earlier idea that had been tried and failed in 1979 was revisited: Creating regional federations for the Americas, Europe, Oceania and Asia, regional groupings mirroring that of the Olympic organisers. This was implemented by 1987, which was rejected later that year because the sport did not meet all the criteria established and it was not yet a global sport. The IOC viewed the sport as one belonging only to the Commonwealth of Nations. While netball was rejected for a third time, the New Zealand hosts of the 1990 Commonwealth Games managed to get the sport to have demonstration status, with the news of this being announced in 1987. That same year, netball also gained full member status from the General Assembly of International Sports Federations In the meantime, the IOC did provide the Federation with a US$1,000 grant, though none of this grant money was used by 1991. Because of what appeared to be the unlikely recognition by the IOC, the Federation urged its national members to seek membership with their national Olympic committees so national federations could access national funding in order to help grow the sport inside their home countries.

The INF decided try again for Olympic recognition, but the Federation was irritated because they had never been given clear guidelines for what the IOC was looking for in terms of a federation gaining Olympic recognition. The Federation believed that every time they met the criteria they were given, there was a new hoop for them to jump through. An example of this was a requirement given to the Federation 1992/1993 that the IOC be given technical specs for venue space should the sport be included on the Olympic programme. The Federation continued to work to address these requirements and eventually, in October 1993, netball through IFNA was given provisional Olympic recognition, requiring a two-year probation period. This recognition came with a US$10,000 per year per region for the Federation to develop the sport around the world.

In 1995, the IOC recognition of the INF became permanent, after a twenty-year period of lobbying and a two-year probation period. This is just one prerequisite to netball being added to future Games. IOC recognition of INF has meant national associations could become full members of their countries' national Olympic committees. National members of INF were able to apply for that recognition by 1993. The All Australia Netball Association is one national organisation that has become a full member of their national Olympic committee. In 2004, IOC recognition of the INF was renewed. The INF has made Olympic recognition part of its long-term strategy towards continuing to grow the game.

Netball supporters tried over many years to get the sport played in the Summer Olympics. In 1996, the netball leadership actively pursued the possibility of netball being played at the 2000 Summer Olympics. The government of New South Wales encouraged the Australian Olympic Committee to lobby for the inclusion of netball in the 2008 Beijing Olympic games. Prime Minister Gordon Brown, Netball England national team member Tamsin Greenway, two time Olympic gold medallist Kelly Holmes and Olympic heptathlon competitor Denise Lewis are English supporters who in 2011 supported adding netball to the Olympic games.

In an extraordinary session in Mexico City in November 2002, the IOC decided to limit the total number of sports to 28, events to 301 and athletes to 10,500, slowing the process of adding new sports to future Olympic Games. At the extraordinary session, the IOC set forth the requirements that a sport must meet before it is eligible for inclusion in the Olympic programme. The table created in the documentation for this meeting is provided below:

Name	Example	Conditions to be met for inclusion in the Olympic Games
Federation	Fédération Internationale de Natation	Administer one or several sports at world level and encompass organisations administering such sports at national level (national federations)
Federation	Fédération Internationale de Natation	Have statutes, practice and activities in conformity with the Olympic Charter
Federation	Fédération Internationale de Natation	Have adopted and implemented the World Anti-Doping Code
Sport	Aquatics	For the Games of the Olympiad: be widely practised by men in at least 75 countries and on four continents and by women in at least 40 countries and on three continents
Sport	Aquatics	For the Winter Games: be widely practised in at least 20 countries on three continents
Sport	Aquatics	Have adopted and implemented the World Anti-Doping Code
Sport	Aquatics	Be admitted to the programme seven years before the Olympic Games
Discipline	Diving	Have a recognised international standing
Discipline	Diving	For the Games of the Olympiad: be widely practised by men in at least 75 countries and on four continents and by women in at least 40 countries and on three continents
Discipline	Diving	For the Winter Games: be widely practised in at least 25 countries on three continents
Discipline	Diving	Be admitted to the programme seven years before the Olympic Games
Event	Individual springboard (diving)	Have a recognised international standing both numerically and geographically, and have been included at least twice in world or continental championships
Event	Individual springboard (diving)	Be practised by men in at least 50 countries and on three continents and by women in at least 35 countries and on three continents
Event	Individual springboard (diving)	Be admitted three years before the Olympic Games

The requirements that sports, disciplines, and events be practised in a minimum number of countries, formerly found in Rule 47 of the Olympic Charter, were removed from the Olympic Charter in 2007.

In July 2016, the INF adopted a policy which said, "The INF will continue to apply resources towards the goal of inclusion in the Olympic Games." The Olympic movement has been open to adding similar sports, and on 9 June 2017, the Executive Board of the International Olympic Committee announced that 3x3 basketball would become an official Olympic sport as of the 2020 Summer Olympics in Tokyo, Japan, for both men and women.

== Funding ==
The lack of Olympic recognition hampered the globalisation of the game in developing countries because the Olympic Solidarity Movement provides access to funding for these nations through the International Olympic Committee. In some countries, such as Tanzania, the lack of access to Olympic funding cut off other options such as funding by the British Council. With official recognition, funding from the IOC, the Olympic Solidarity Movement and the British Council became available to cover costs for travel to international competitions. For some nations, without that assistance, trying to maintain international calibre teams was difficult. Olympic recognition brought money for development into the sport. In 2004, INF received a grant of US$10,000 from the IOC for development. INF was given an additional US$3,300 a year until 2007 by the Association of IOC Recognised International Sports (ARISF).

Beyond access to funds from the IOC, state and national sporting bodies, and state and federal governments often use IOC status as a funding criteria. This has been the case in Australia, and British Columbia, Canada. In 1985, the Australian Sports Commission and the Office of the Status of Women identified five criteria for obtaining federal funding. One of these was "status as an Olympic sport and its size by registrations." (Note: Netball qualified for funding because it met the other criteria. From 1980 to 1984, the sport received A$497,000 in funding.) In British Columbia, one of the guidelines says that in order to receive funding, "the sport must be on the program for either the 2011 or 2013 Canada Games and/or the next scheduled recognized International Multi-Sport Games (Olympics/Paralympics, Pan American or Commonwealth Games, Special Olympic World Games)".

The IOC and its affiliated organisations give awards and scholarships. In 1995, two of the scholarships offered by the Oceania Olympic Training Centre were given to netballers: Janaet Snape and Darlene Marsters. The Oceania Olympic Training Centre also made it possible for Mona-Lisa Leka from Papua New Guinea to go to Australia to train. In 2007, the IOC awarded Veitu Apana Diro, the Vice-President of the NOC of Papua New, the Trophy for Oceania. This recognition came in part because she had created the nation's national netball organisation in 1965 and actively promoted women's involvement in netball around the country.

== Media coverage ==
Netball is most popular in Commonwealth countries, and the most popular women's spectator sport in Australia and Tanzania and the effort to increase media attention and participation for women's sport often goes to Olympic sports with low participation rates, low rates of interest and few facilities. Even then, historically, coverage of women's team sports in the Olympics has been limited. Instead, according to Jones, the media focus on female athletes in non-team competitions and on team sports played equally by both genders.

== National associations ==
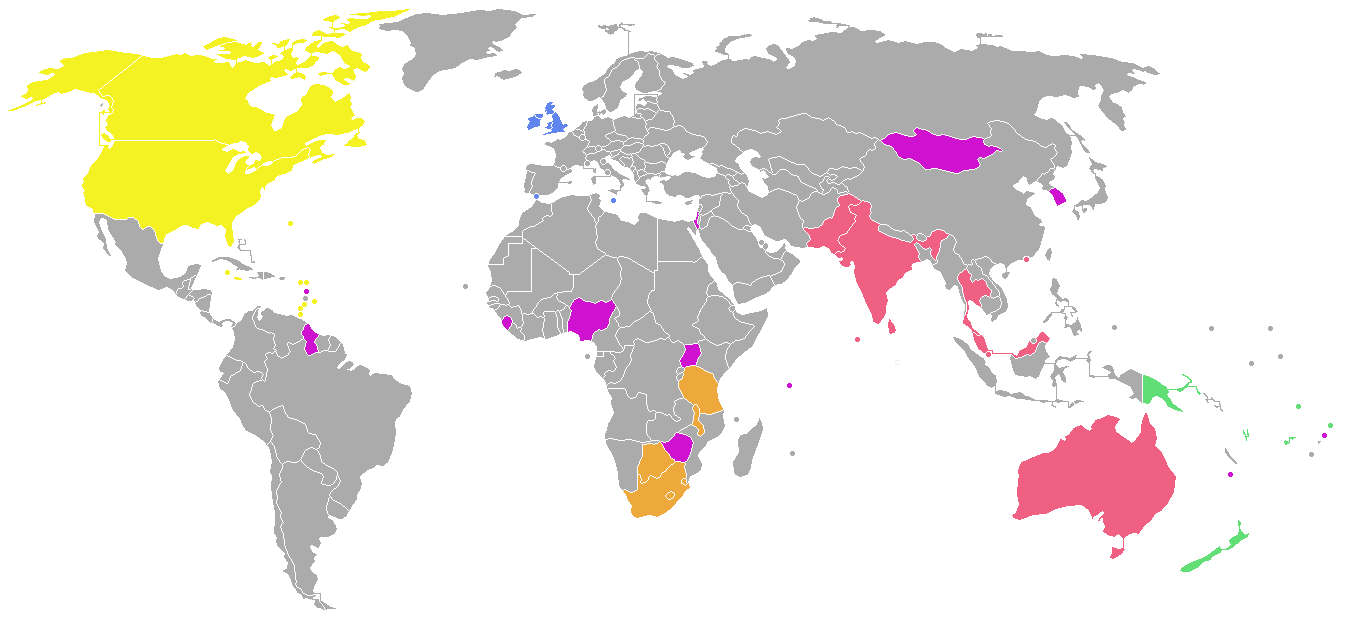
Countries with Netball associations (coloured)

National netball associations have been involved with national Olympic committees as members or associate members, or had their administrators generally involved with national Olympic Committees, for a long time. In the case of the Bahamas, by 1960 the Bahamas Olympic Association had as one of its member organisations the national netball association. Netball was also represented in the Dominica Olympic Committee almost from the moment the organisation was founded. Some of the national netball federations that are affiliated with their national Olympic Committee include Netball Singapore and the All Australia Netball Association.

== Bibliography ==
- Australian Sport Commission; Office of the Status of Women (1985). Women, Sport and the Media. Australian Government Publishing Services. ISBN 0-644-04155-2.
- BBC (6 January 2011). "Mentor wants netball at Olympics". Archived from the original on 12 September 2011.
- Community, Sport and Cultural Development - Province of British Columbia (2011). "BC ATHLETE ASSISTANCE PROGRAM 2010 - 2011 Provincial Sport Organization Guidelines, Policies and Procedures" (PDF). Archived from the original (PDF) on 9 April 2011.
- Crocombe, R G (2007). Asia in the Pacific Islands : replacing the West. CIPS Publications, University of the South Pacific. ISBN 978-982-02-0388-4. OCLC 213886360.
- Dominica Olympic Committee (24 April 2010). "History". Archived from the original on 30 April 2010.
- Dyer, K F (1982). Challenging the Men, The social biology of female sporting achievement. University of Queensland Press. ISBN 0-7022-1652-6.
- Embrey, Lynn (1995). "The Olympics". Batter up! : the history of softball in Australia. Bayswater, Vic.: Australian Softball Federation. pp. 152–156. ISBN 0646264850. OCLC 37094381.
- Hyland, Deirdre; McHugh, Dorothy (2011). Netball state of play : IFNA 50 years history challenge future. Sherwood, Qld.: Deirdre Hyland AM and Dorothy McHugh OAM. ISBN 978-0-646-55640-6. OCLC 730045319.
- International Federation of Netball Associations. "About IFNA". Archived from the original on 8 March 2011.
- International Olympic Committee (2007). "IOC 2007 WOMEN & SPORT TROPHY WINNERS" (PDF).
- International Olympic Committee (February 2008). "The sports on the Olympic programme" (PDF).
- Jordan, David (13 January 2011). "Greenway calls for netball's Olympic inclusion". Sportsbeat & News Associates. Archived from the original on 16 March 2011.
- Jones, Diane (February 2004). "Half the Story? Olympic Women on the ABC News Online" (PDF). Media International Australia Incorporating Culture and Policy. 110 (110): 132–146. doi:10.1177/1329878X0411000114. S2CID 54039376. Archived from the original (PDF) on 9 April 2011.
- Massoa, Prisca; Fasting, Kari (December 2002). "Women and sport in Tanzania". In Pfister, Gertrud; Hartmann-Tews, Ilse (eds.). Sport and Women: Social Issues in International Perspective. International Society for Comparative Physical Education & Sport. Routledge. ISBN 0-415-24628-8.
- McCann, Liam (2006). The Olympics. London: Facts, Figures & Fun. ISBN 1904332404. OCLC 62892347.
- Ministry of Education & Culture (1970). Annual report - Commonwealth of the Bahamas, Ministry of Education and Culture. Ministry of Education & Culture. OCLC 1793427.
- Netball Australia (1 March 1996). "All Australian Netball Association 1995 Annual Report" (PDF). Archived from the original (PDF) on 19 March 2011.
- Alison Megarrity (21 September 2004). "Matter of Public Importance". Parliamentary Debates (Hansard). Parliament of New South Wales: Legislative Assembly. col. 11179–11179.
- Pfister, Gertrud; Hartmann-Tews, Ilse (December 2002). "Women's inclusion in sport, International and comparative findings". In Pfister, Gertrud; Hartmann-Tews, Ilse (eds.). Sport and Women: Social Issues in International Perspective. International Society for Comparative Physical Education & Sport. Routledge. pp. 267–280. ISBN 0-415-24628-8.
- Samoa Observer (18 December 2008). "Samoa prepares for World netball series". Samoa Observer. Apia, Samoa. Archived from the original on 7 June 2011.
- Shooting for Success (July 2004). "IFNA Recognition Confirmed" (PDF). International Federation of Netball Associations. Archived from the original (PDF) on 9 April 2011.
- Singapore National Olympic Council (2011). "National Sport Associations". Archived from the original on 26 May 2011.
- Smartt, Pam; Chalmers, David (29 January 2009). "Obstructing the goal? Hospitalisation for netball injury in New Zealand 2000–2005". The New Zealand Medical Journal. 122 (1288): 62–75. PMID 19182843. Archived from the original on 17 March 2011.
- Symons, Carol; Hemphill, Dennis (November 2006). "Netball and transgender participation". In Caudwell, Jayne (ed.). Sport, sexualities and queer/theory. Routledge Critical Studies in Sport. Routledge. pp. 122–124. ISBN 0-415-36761-1.
- Taylor, Tracy (November 2001). "Gendering Sport: The Development of Netball in Australia" (PDF). Sporting Traditions, Journal of the Australian Society for Sports History. 18 (1): 57–74. Archived from the original (PDF) on 2 April 2012.
- United Nations (2007). Women, Gender Equality and Sport. New York: United Nations Division for the Advancement of Women.
- Wu, Andrew (9 June 2012). "Games changer". The Sydney Morning Herald. Sydney, Australia.
