= Saudi Arabia national netball team =

Saudi Arabia
- Association: Saudi Netball
- Confederation: Netball Asia

First international
- Saudi Arabia 14–74 Maldives; Bengaluru, India, 18 October 2024

Largest defeat
- Sri Lanka 118–5 Saudi Arabia; Bengaluru, India, 19 October 2024

Saudi Arabia national netball team represents the Saudi Arabia in international netball competitions.

== History ==
The Saudi Netball Federation was established in 2021 and is among the 16 sports federations announced by the Saudi Arabian Olympic Committee in May of that year.

The Saudi Arabia national team made its debut at the Asian Netball Championships in the 2024 edition.

== Competitive history ==
Asian Netball Championships
Year	Competition	Location	Placing
2022	2022 Asian Netball Championships	Singapore	Did not enter
2024	2024 Asian Netball Championships	Bengaluru, India	13th
