= Malaysian Netball Association =

Malaysian sporting body

- Founded: 1978; 48 years ago
- President: Alwiyah Talib
- Secretary: Zainon Md Noh

Official website
- www.pbjm.net
- (Malaysia)

Malaysian Netball Association (Malay: Persatuan Bola Jaring Malaysia) is the national body which oversees, promotes and manages netball in Malaysia. Established in 1978, the Malaysian Netball Association hosted the first Asian Netball Championship in 1985, and the 3rd Asian Youth Netball Championship.
