= Netball at the 2015 SEA Games =

- Venue: OCBC Arena Hall 1
- Dates: 31 May–7 June 2015
- Competitors: 68 from 6 nations

Medalists
gold medal	Singapore (SIN)
silver medal	Malaysia (MAS)
bronze medal	Thailand (THA)
bronze medal	Brunei (BRU)

Netball at the 2015 Southeast Asian Games is being held in OCBC Arena Hall 1, in Kallang, Singapore from 31 May to 7 June 2015.

== Participating nations ==
A total of 68 athletes from six nations are competing in netball at the 2015 Southeast Asian Games:

- Brunei (12)
- Malaysia (12)
- Myanmar (10)
- Philippines (10)
- Singapore (12)
- Thailand (12)

== Competition schedule ==
The following is the competition schedule for the netball competitions:

P	Preliminaries	½	Semifinals	B	3rd place play-off	F	Final

Event↓/Date →	Sun 31	Mon 1	Tue 2	Wed 3	Thu 4	Fri 5	Sat 6	Sun 7	
Women	P	P	P	P	P		½	B	F

== Medalists ==
Event	Gold	Silver	Bronze
Women	Singapore (SIN); Nurul Baizura Abdul Razak; Ang Shiqi; Chen Huifen; Chen Li Li; Premila Hirubalan; Ho Xiu Xiu Yasmin; Koh Shelby Lian; Liew Pamela Jing Mei; Kimberly Lim; Lin Qingyi; Charmaine Soh; Teo Shina Xue Na	Malaysia (MAS); Nurfariha Abdul Razak; Nurul Adha Abu Bakar; Noor Azilah Aziz; An Najwa Azizan; Norashikin Kamalzaman; Fazira Mesnan; Nur Syafazlyana Mohd Ali; Izyan Syazana Mohd Wazir; Siti Nor Farhana Mustafa; Pow Mei Foong; Yap Suo Kuen; Noramirah Dayana Noor Azhar	Thailand (THA); Yada Boonkong; Rattiyakorn Buathong; Paweena Kamwan; Wirawan Khorwanna; Pimchanok Kongsub; Kliawked Panchutturud; Sirima Samnaree; Pacharee Sangjan; Viyada Sankam; Siriwan Seenongsaeng; Rungnapa Seetongbon; Jitraphon Siriwong
Women	Singapore (SIN); Nurul Baizura Abdul Razak; Ang Shiqi; Chen Huifen; Chen Li Li; Premila Hirubalan; Ho Xiu Xiu Yasmin; Koh Shelby Lian; Liew Pamela Jing Mei; Kimberly Lim; Lin Qingyi; Charmaine Soh; Teo Shina Xue Na	Malaysia (MAS); Nurfariha Abdul Razak; Nurul Adha Abu Bakar; Noor Azilah Aziz; An Najwa Azizan; Norashikin Kamalzaman; Fazira Mesnan; Nur Syafazlyana Mohd Ali; Izyan Syazana Mohd Wazir; Siti Nor Farhana Mustafa; Pow Mei Foong; Yap Suo Kuen; Noramirah Dayana Noor Azhar	Brunei (BRU); Nurrafiqah Afifi Abdullah; Siti Marhayati Ahmad; Syafiqah Niqmatullah Amraan; Nur Hafizah Haji Abdul Sidek; Hajah Siti Shamsiah Haji Sajali; Nur Syuhaidah Fahriyana Hj Sukri; Siti Norsaihah Mohammad Adi Najmi; Athiyyah As'ad Mohd Jafar; Dk Khalisha Pg Abd Rahman; Dk Nur Amal Nadhirah Pg Md Ali; Siti Nur Syaahidah Rashid; Nursazwilla Rosdie

== Medal table ==
* Host nation (Singapore)

Rank	Nation	Gold	Silver	Bronze	Total
1	Singapore (SIN)*	1	0	0	1
2	Malaysia (MAS)	0	1	0	1
3	Brunei (BRU)	0	0	1	1
3	Thailand (THA)	0	0	1	1
Totals (4 entries)		1	1	2	4

== Preliminary round ==
Source: Tournament Summary - Women

All times are Singapore Standard Time (UTC+08:00)

Pos	Team	Pld	W	D	L	GF	GA	GD	Pts	Final Result
1	Malaysia	5	4	1	0	384	124	+260	9	Final round
2	Singapore (H)	5	4	1	0	341	112	+229	9	Final round
3	Thailand	5	3	0	2	234	224	+10	6	Final round
4	Brunei	5	2	0	3	197	278	−81	4	Final round
5	Myanmar	5	1	0	4	171	327	−156	2	
6	Philippines	5	0	0	5	108	370	−262	0	

Source: Seagames 2015
(H) Hosts

31 May 2015; 12:00	Report	Singapore	72 – 21	Brunei	OCBC Arena Hall 1, Singapore
31 May 2015; 12:00	Report	Scoring by quarter: 19 – 6, 20 – 2, 16 – 8, 17 – 5			OCBC Arena Hall 1, Singapore

31 May 2015; 14:00	Report	Philippines	22 – 62	Thailand	OCBC Arena Hall 1, Singapore
31 May 2015; 14:00	Report	Scoring by quarter: 6 – 10, 8 – 14, 2 – 20, 6 – 18			OCBC Arena Hall 1, Singapore

31 May 2015; 17:30	Report	Malaysia	84 – 22	Myanmar	OCBC Arena Hall 1, Singapore
31 May 2015; 17:30	Report	Scoring by quarter: 24 – 3, 23 – 4, 20 – 7, 17 – 8			OCBC Arena Hall 1, Singapore

1 June 2015; 13:30	Report	Brunei	56 – 47	Myanmar	OCBC Arena Hall 1, Singapore
1 June 2015; 13:30	Report	Scoring by quarter: 15 – 13, 15 – 12, 13 – 13, 13 – 9			OCBC Arena Hall 1, Singapore

1 June 2015; 15:30	Report	Malaysia	112 – 11	Philippines	OCBC Arena Hall 1, Singapore
1 June 2015; 15:30	Report	Scoring by quarter: 32 – 1, 29 – 2, 27 – 2, 24 – 6			OCBC Arena Hall 1, Singapore

1 June 2015; 19:00	Report	Thailand	24 – 65	Singapore	OCBC Arena Hall 1, Singapore
1 June 2015; 19:00	Report	Scoring by quarter: 5 – 17, 6 – 15, 8 – 14, 5 – 19			OCBC Arena Hall 1, Singapore

2 June 2015; 13:30	Report	Myanmar	56 – 31	Philippines	OCBC Arena Hall 1, Singapore
2 June 2015; 13:30	Report	Scoring by quarter: 17 – 8, 12 – 7, 13 – 6, 14 – 10			OCBC Arena Hall 1, Singapore

2 June 2015; 15:30	Report	Thailand	45 – 40	Brunei	OCBC Arena Hall 1, Singapore
2 June 2015; 15:30	Report	Scoring by quarter: 7 – 9, 11 – 14, 16 – 5, 11 – 12			OCBC Arena Hall 1, Singapore

2 June 2015; 19:00	Report	Singapore	35 – 35	Malaysia	OCBC Arena Hall 1, Singapore
2 June 2015; 19:00	Report	Scoring by quarter: 13 – 8, 9 – 11, 8 – 5, 5 – 11			OCBC Arena Hall 1, Singapore

3 June 2015; 13:30	Report	Myanmar	26 – 71	Thailand	OCBC Arena Hall 1, Singapore
3 June 2015; 13:30	Report	Scoring by quarter: 6 – 19, 6 – 23, 6 – 15, 8 – 14			OCBC Arena Hall 1, Singapore

3 June 2015; 15:30	Report	Brunei	24 – 82	Malaysia	OCBC Arena Hall 1, Singapore
3 June 2015; 15:30	Report	Scoring by quarter: 3 – 21, 6 – 17, 10 – 22, 5 – 22			OCBC Arena Hall 1, Singapore

3 June 2015; 19:00	Report	Singapore	84 – 12	Philippines	OCBC Arena Hall 1, Singapore
3 June 2015; 19:00	Report	Scoring by quarter: 21 – 3, 21 – 5, 21 – 3, 21 – 1			OCBC Arena Hall 1, Singapore

4 June 2015; 13:30	Report	Philippines	32 – 56	Brunei	OCBC Arena Hall 1, Singapore
4 June 2015; 13:30	Report	Scoring by quarter: 9 – 9, 8 – 13, 6 – 19, 9 – 15			OCBC Arena Hall 1, Singapore

4 June 2015; 15:30	Report	Malaysia	71 – 32	Thailand	OCBC Arena Hall 1, Singapore
4 June 2015; 15:30	Report	Scoring by quarter: 19 – 6, 24 – 5, 12 – 11, 16 – 10			OCBC Arena Hall 1, Singapore

4 June 2015; 19:00	Report	Myanmar	20 – 85	Singapore	OCBC Arena Hall 1, Singapore
4 June 2015; 19:00	Report	Scoring by quarter: 6 – 20, 6 – 25, 2 – 22, 6 – 18			OCBC Arena Hall 1, Singapore

== Final round ==
Semi-finals
6 June – OCBC Arena Hall 1
Malaysia	79
Brunei	23
6 June – OCBC Arena Hall 1
Singapore	59
Thailand	29

Gold medal match
7 June – OCBC Arena Hall 1
Malaysia	43
Singapore	46

=== Semi-finals ===
6 June 2015; 14:00	Report	Malaysia	79 – 23	Brunei	OCBC Arena Hall 1, Singapore
6 June 2015; 14:00	Report	Scoring by quarter: 23 – 10, 21 – 4, 17 – 3, 18 – 6			OCBC Arena Hall 1, Singapore

6 June 2015; 16:00	Report	Singapore	59 – 29	Thailand	OCBC Arena Hall 1, Singapore
6 June 2015; 16:00	Report	Scoring by quarter: 11 – 7, 21 – 5, 9 – 8, 18 – 9			OCBC Arena Hall 1, Singapore

=== Gold medal match ===
7 June 2015; 14:00	Report	Malaysia	43 – 46	Singapore	OCBC Arena Hall 1, Singapore
7 June 2015; 14:00	Report	Scoring by quarter: 10 – 11, 10 – 14, 11 – 11, 12 – 10			OCBC Arena Hall 1, Singapore

== Final standing ==
Rank	Team
1st place, gold medalist(s)	Singapore
2nd place, silver medalist(s)	Malaysia
3rd place, bronze medalist(s)	Brunei
3rd place, bronze medalist(s)	Thailand
5	Myanmar
6	Philippines

Netball at the 2015 Southeast Asian Games champions

Singapore
1st title
