= Brunei national netball team =

National netball team of Brunei

Brunei
- Logo of the Royal Bees
- Nickname(s): Royal Bees
- Association: Brunei Netball Association
- Confederation: Asia Netball
- Head coach: Hafizah Sidek
- Captain: Fadzilah Lubabul Bolkiah
- World ranking: 34
Team colours

First international
- Brunei 26 – 26 Maldives; Sugathadasa Stadium, Sri Lanka, 25 August 2012

Largest win
- Brunei 91 – 13 Pakistan; Sugathadasa Stadium, Sri Lanka, 26 August 2012

Largest defeat
- Malaysia 72 – 11 Brunei; Sugathadasa Stadium, Sri Lanka, 29 August 2012

The Brunei national netball team nicknamed Royal Bees, is the national team representing Brunei in international netball competitions. The team is currently coached by Jane Searle, and captained by Princess Fadzilah Lubabul Bolkiah. As of 2 December 2022, Brunei are 34th on the INF World Rankings.

== History ==
Brunei made its international netball debut during the 2012 Asian Netball Championships, where the first game ended in a 26–26 draw with Maldives. They then made their biggest win by thrashing Pakistan in a 91–13 victory, but only to suffer 76–18 and 72–11 defeats, by Singapore and Malaysia respectively.

At the 2015 Southeast Asian Games, the national team of Brunei secured a bronze medal for being one of the two semifinalists. Brunei repeated this feat again at the 2017 Southeast Asian Games for finishing as one of the semifinalists. In the 2017 edition of the Games, Brunei was guided by Sri Lankan coach, Thilaka Jinadasa. Before the regional stint, they went to Kota Kinabalu and played a series of matches against the Sri Lanka School Team in April 2017 and played exposure matches against Singaporean netball teams in Singapore in May 2017 as preparation.

Alongside Singapore and Pakistan, Brunei has been pooled into Group 'C' of the 2018 Asian Netball Championships in which they finished sixth in the tournament. Brunei took part in the 2019 Southeast Asian Games which was held in Laguna, Philippines. They returned from the tournament with bronze medals with Prince Sufri Bolkiah as the awardee. The Royal Bees participated in the 2022 Asian Netball Championships which was held in Singapore. The team again concluded the tournament in sixth place after a final 51–42 win over Maldives at the OCBC Arena.

== Players ==
Ten players were selected to participate at the 2022 Asian Netball Championships.

Philippines national netball team
| Player | Position | Height (cm) |
| Siti Marhayati (captain) | GA | |
| Zuraidah Amit | C | |
| Siti Nuril Nazihah | GD | |
| Nurul Ajeerah Abdullah | GK | |
| Nurulain Abdul Hamid | GS, GA | |
| Norros Hafizah Zanuidi | WA | |
| Amirah Fazzeratul Hidayah | GA | |
| Hidayah Puteh | WA | |
| Siti Faizah Azni | GS, GD | |
| Ummi Ramizah Jeluddin | WD | |
| Noor Zinatul Azimah | WD | |
| Wong Jo Lin | - | |
| Isabel Maria Pia Vele | GD | |

== Coaches ==
| Coach | Years |
|---|---|
| (Sri Lanka) Thilaka Jinadasa | 2011–2018 |
| (Australia) Jane Searle | 2018–2022 |
| (Brunei) Hafizah Sidek | 2022–present |

== Competitive history ==
Southeast Asian Games
| Year | Championship | Location | Placing |
|---|---|---|---|
| 2015 | 2015 Southeast Asian Games | Singapore | 3rd place, bronze medalist(s) |
| 2017 | 2017 Southeast Asian Games | Kuala Lumpur, Malaysia | 3rd place, bronze medalist(s) |
| 2019 | 2019 Southeast Asian Games | Laguna, Philippines | 3rd place, bronze medalist(s) |
