= Netball Singapore =

- Founded: 1962; 64 years ago

Official website
- www.netball.org.sg
- (Singapore)

Netball Singapore, founded in 1962, is the national body for netball in Singapore. In 2002, the Association was named a merit sport by the Singapore Sports Council.

Netball Singapore, established in 1962, is the national governing body for netball in Singapore. Over the years, Netball Singapore has evolved into a professionally run National Sports Association, with a significant portion of its funding derived from sponsorship and various revenue sources. Today, the association supports over 80 multi-team club members, and netball is part of the curriculum in more than 200 schools nationwide. Netball Singapore is committed to fostering, promoting, and advancing the sport of netball at all levels in the country.

In 1999, Netball Singapore established the Netball Super League with six teams competing to emerge as Champion. This opens up an exchange for players from different clubs, ages and skillsets.

The body also controls the Singapore national team, the Singapore Vandas.

In recent years, the Singapore Vandas has achieved strong results on the international stage. The team won gold at the 2024 Asian Netball Championships, reclaimed after a 10-year wait, and finished 15th at the 2023 Netball World Cup. The team also won the 2023 Nations Cup after a 16-year wait. The national team was named Team of the Year (Sport) at the Singapore Sports Awards in 2015, 2016 and 2025.
