= Netball in Thailand =

- Country: Thailand
- National team: Thailand

Thailand had a national team compete in the fifth Asian Netball Championship held in Colombo, Sri Lanka in 2001.

Thailand competed in the 7th Asian Youth Netball Championship held in 2010 in India.

== Bibliography ==
- Government of Sri Lanka (21 July 2001). "5th Asian Netball Championship next week in Colombo". Archived from the original on 26 January 2004.
- International Federation of Netball Associations (21 January 2011a). "Current World Rankings". Archived from the original on 19 May 2011.
- Sagar, Naresh (4 July 2010). "Asian Youth Netball Championship". Sagar Media. Archived from the original on 15 July 2011.
