= Netball =

Seven-a-side ball sport

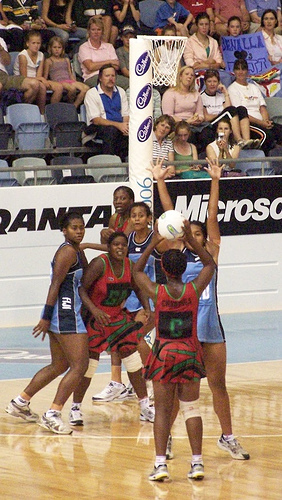
- Malawi (red) playing Fiji (blue) at the 2006 Commonwealth Games
- Highest governing body: World Netball
- First played: 1897; 129 years ago in England
- Registered players: 561,000+ (Note: Numbers are taken, where available, from the 48 member nations of the International Federation of Netball Associations: (Cook Islands 1,000, Fiji 5,000, New Zealand 135,000, Papua New Guinea 10,000, Samoa 2,000, England 75,000, Scotland 1,800, Australia 330,000 and Hong Kong 1,200. (Note: No current numbers are available for Vanuatu, Botswana, Eswatini, Ghana, Kenya, Lesotho, Malawi, Namibia, South Africa, Tanzania, Uganda, Zimbabwe, Zambia, Gibraltar, Malta, Northern Ireland, Ireland, Wales, Switzerland, China, India, Malaysia, Republic of the Maldives, Pakistan, Sri Lanka, Thailand, Argentina, Antigua & Barbuda, Barbados, Bermuda, Canada, Cayman Islands, Grenada, Jamaica, Trinidad & Tobago, St. Lucia, St Vincent and the Grenadines, and the United States.))

Netball is a ball sport played on a rectangular court by two teams of seven players. The primary objective is to shoot a ball through the defender's goal ring while preventing the opposing team from shooting through their own. It is one of a few sports created exclusively for women and girls; it remains primarily played by them, on indoor and outdoor courts, especially in schools and most popularly in the Commonwealth of Nations. According to World Netball, the sport is played by more than 20 million people in more than 80 countries. World Netball comprises more than 70 national teams organised into five global regions. Major domestic leagues in the sport include the Netball Superleague in Great Britain, Super Netball in Australia and the ANZ Premiership in New Zealand.

Four major competitions take place internationally: the World Netball Championships and Commonwealth Games, both quadrennial, and the Quad Series and Fast5 Series, both annual. In 1995, the International Netball Federation (now known as World Netball) became an International Olympic Committee recognised sport federation, but netball has not yet been played at the Olympics.

== Description and rules ==
A netball court's dimensions. The court is divided into thirds and shooting circles are at each end.

The objective of a game is to score more goals than the opposition. Goals are scored when a team member positioned in the attacking "shooting circle" shoots the ball through the goal ring. The goal rings are 380 mm (15 in) in diameter and sit atop 3.05 m (10.0 ft)-high goal posts that have no backboards. The 4.9 m (16 ft)-radius semi-circular shooting circles are located at each end of the court, and contain the goal posts. Each team defends one shooting circle and attacks the other. The netball court is 30.5 m (100 ft) long, 15.25 m (50 ft) wide, and divided lengthwise into thirds. The ball is usually made of leather or rubber, measures ≈22 cm (8.7 in) in diameter (680 to 710 mm (2.23 to 2.33 ft) in circumference), and weighs 397 to 454 g (14.0 to 16.0 oz). A normal game consists of four 15-minute quarters and can be played outdoors or in a covered stadium.

Each team is allowed seven players on the court. Each player is assigned a specific position, which limits their movement to a certain area of the court. A bib worn by each player contains a one- or two-letter abbreviation indicating their position. Only two positions are permitted in the attacking shooting circle, and can therefore shoot for a goal. Similarly, only two positions are permitted in the defensive shooting circle to prevent the opposition from shooting goals. Other players are restricted to two-thirds of the court, with the exception of the centre, who may move anywhere on the court except for a shooting circle.

Australia v England 12 October 2011 test match held in Canberra

At the beginning of every quarter and after a goal has been scored, play starts with a player in the centre position passing the ball from the centre of the court. These "centre passes" alternate between the teams, regardless of which team scored the last goal. When the umpire blows the whistle to restart play, four players from each team can move into the centre third to receive the pass. The centre pass must be caught or touched in the centre third.

The ball is then moved up and down the court through passing and must be touched by a player in each adjacent third of the court. Players can hold the ball for only three seconds at any time. It must be released before the foot they were standing on when they caught it touches the ground again.

Contact between players is only permitted if it does not impede an opponent or the general play. When defending a pass or shot, players must be at least 90 centimetres (35 in) away from the player with the ball. If illegal contact is made, the player who contacted cannot participate in play until the player taking the penalty has passed or shot the ball. If the ball is held in two hands and either dropped or a shot at goal is missed, the same player cannot be the first to touch it unless it first rebounds off the goal.

A player is offside if they enter an area of the court in which their position is not permitted. Each position has specific court areas where they may move, and stepping into a restricted zone is considered an offside infringement. Being offside can occur with or without the ball. If two opposing players enter an offside area simultaneously neither gains an advantage, play continues under the advantage rule. When an offside infringement is penalised, a free pass is awarded to the opposing team in the area where the violation occurred, and the infringing player must remain out of play until the pass is taken.

== Equipment ==
Aside from the court and nets, netball uses a ball that is around 70 cm in circumference and weighs 400 to 450 grams. Balls are made from leather, rubber, or similar material.

A player typically wears a jersey or tank top with a skort or shorts. Players may alternatively wear specialist one-piece netball dresses, particularly at higher levels.

== History ==
Netball's early development emerged from Clara Baer's misinterpretation of the early rules of James Naismith's new sport of basketball, and eventually evolved into its own sport. Basketball, invented in 1891, was initially played indoors between two teams of nine players, using an association football that was thrown into closed-end peach baskets. Naismith's game spread quickly across the United States and variations of the rules soon emerged.

At the same time, physical education instructor Senda Berenson developed modified rules for women in 1892. Berenson's rules eventually gave rise to women's basketball, and separate intercollegiate rules for basketball for men and women developed around the same time.

Clara Baer was a sports teacher living in New Orleans when she wrote to Naismith asking for a copy of the rules for his game of basketball. Once she received them, they included a diagram of the court with lines across it which were meant to show the areas various players could best patrol. She misinterpreted the lines and believed they marked out restricted areas of play which players could not leave. Her mistake marks the beginning of netball. Baer's version for the rules of women's basketball defined these areas as restricted zones, an error which then became ratified into the rules for women's basketball in 1899 and proliferated.

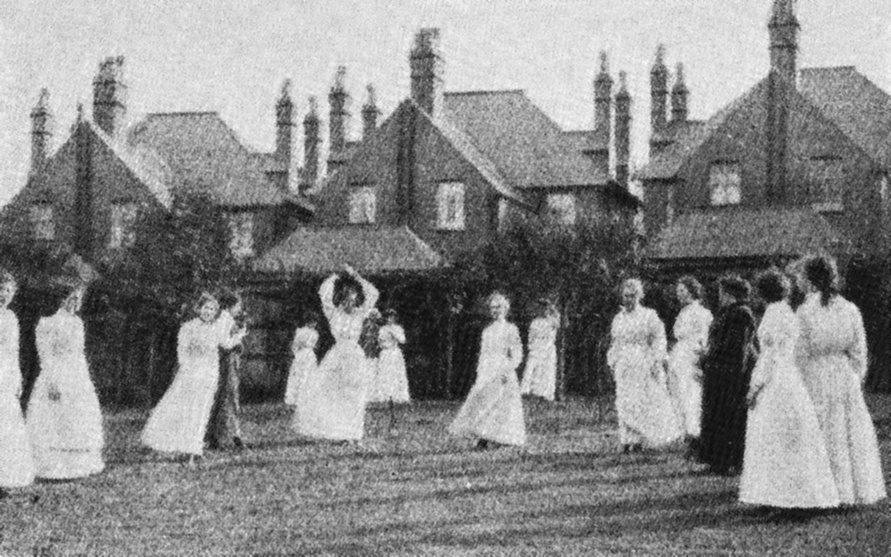
Women in England playing netball on a grass court, 1910

Martina Bergman-Österberg introduced a version of basketball in 1893 to her female students at the Physical Training College in Hampstead, London. The rules of the game were modified at the college over several years: the game moved outdoors and was played on grass; the baskets were replaced by rings that had nets; and in 1897 and 1899, rules from women's basketball in the United States were incorporated. Österberg's new sport acquired the name "net ball". The first codified rules of netball were published in 1901 by the Ling Association, later the Physical Education Association of the United Kingdom. From England, netball spread to other countries in the British Empire. Variations of the rules and even names for the sport arose in different areas: "women's (outdoor) basketball" arrived in Australia around 1900 and in New Zealand from 1906, while "netball" was being played in Jamaican schools by 1909.

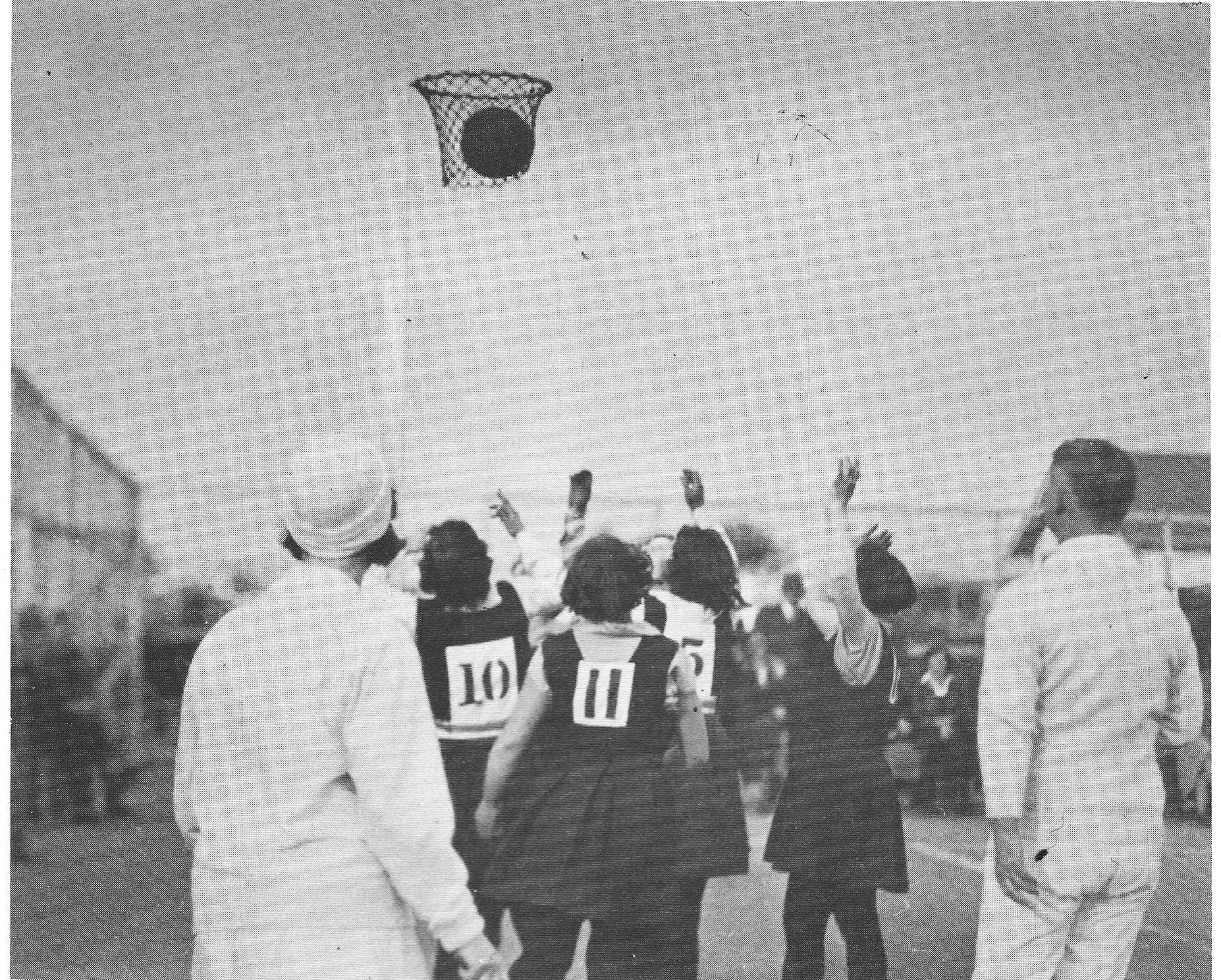
A goal is scored at a women's netball game in New Zealand, circa 1920s.

From the start, it was considered socially appropriate for women to play netball; netball's restricted movement appealed to contemporary notions of women's participation in sport and was distinct from potential rival male sports. Netball became a popular women's sport in countries where it was introduced and spread rapidly through school systems. School leagues and domestic competitions emerged during the first half of the 20th century, and in 1924 the first national governing body was established in New Zealand. International competition was initially hampered by a lack of funds and varying rules in different countries. Australia hosted New Zealand in the first international game of netball in Melbourne on 20 August 1938; Australia won 40–11. Efforts began in 1957 to standardise netball rules globally, and by 1960 international playing rules had been standardised. The same year the International Federation of Netball and Women's Basketball, later the International Netball Federation (INF), was formed to administer the sport worldwide.

Representatives from England, Australia, New Zealand, South Africa, and the West Indies were part of a 1960 meeting in Sri Lanka that standardised the rules for the game. The game spread to other African countries in the 1970s. South Africa was prohibited from competing internationally from 1969 to 1994 due to apartheid. In the United States, Netball's popularity also increased during the 1970s, particularly in the New York area, and the United States of America Netball Association was created in 1992. The game also became popular in the Pacific Island nations of the Cook Islands, Fiji and Samoa during the 1970s. Netball Singapore was created in 1962, and the Malaysian Netball Association was created in 1978.

In Australia, the term women's basketball was used to refer to both netball and basketball. During the 1950s and 1960s, a movement arose to change the Australian name of the game from women's basketball to netball in order to avoid confusion between the two sports. The Australian Basketball Union offered to pay the costs involved to alter the name, but the netball organisation rejected the change. In 1970, the Council of the All Australia Netball Association officially changed the name to "netball" in Australia.

In 1963, the first international tournament was held in Eastbourne, England. Originally called the World Tournament, it later became known as the World Netball Championships. Following the first tournament, one of the organisers, Miss R. Harris, declared:

England could learn from the mistakes in the past from the empty stands at Eastbourne. To get the right publicity and the right status desired, the game must emerge from the school playground. Netball should be part of a sports centre where social events could also be held.

The World Netball Championships have been held every four years since then. The World Youth Netball Championships started in Canberra in 1988, and have been held roughly every four years since. In 1995, the International Olympic Committee recognised the International Federation of Netball Associations. Three years later netball debuted at the 1998 Commonwealth Games in Kuala Lumpur. Other international competitions also emerged in the late 20th century, including the Nations Cup and the Asian Netball Championship.

=== Comparison with basketball ===
Netball's development traces back to American sports teacher Clara Gregory Baer's misinterpretation of the basketball rule book in 1895. The book had lines of patrol drawn on it and she interpreted this to mean that players had to stay in those zones. Baer's modifications proliferated and were later officially ratified into the rules for women's basketball by 1899. Martina Bergman-Österberg had also introduced basketball to her female students at her Physical Training College in England in 1893. In the beginning it was also described as "women's basketball", but by 1897 it started to evolve into a distinctly separate sport based on modifications developed at Bergman-Österberg's college combined with Baer's rules.

The first codified rules of Bergman-Österberg's new sport, netball, were then published in 1901. By 1960, international playing rules had been standardised for the game, and the International Federation of Netball and Women's Basketball, later renamed World Netball, was formed to be the sport's international governing body.

Netball differs in many ways from basketball, principally in the absence of the backboards from the hoop or goal ring and the prohibition of dribbling, bouncing, and running while in possession of the ball. Physical player contact is more controlled than in basketball. In addition, netball not only identifies the different positions of its players, but also defines where and in which areas of the court specific players are allowed to be when they compete.

=== Sex category ===
The sport was created for girls and women; it remains most popular among this demographic, with women's netball at elite and national levels receiving outside funding. Though male netball teams exist in some areas, men's and mixed-sex teams are largely self-funded. Men's netball started to grow in Australia during the 1980s, with the first men's championship being held in 1985. Other countries with men's national teams include Canada, Fiji, Jamaica, Kenya, Pakistan and the United Arab Emirates. In England, the England men's and mixed netball association (EMMNA) was founded in 2019 to develop, promote and govern men's and mixed netball teams in partnership with the national governing body.

In June 2025, World Netball announced a major update to its global events strategy, including the introduction of the first Men's Netball World Cup, marking a step towards establishing a global competitive pathway for male athletes.

==== Other ====
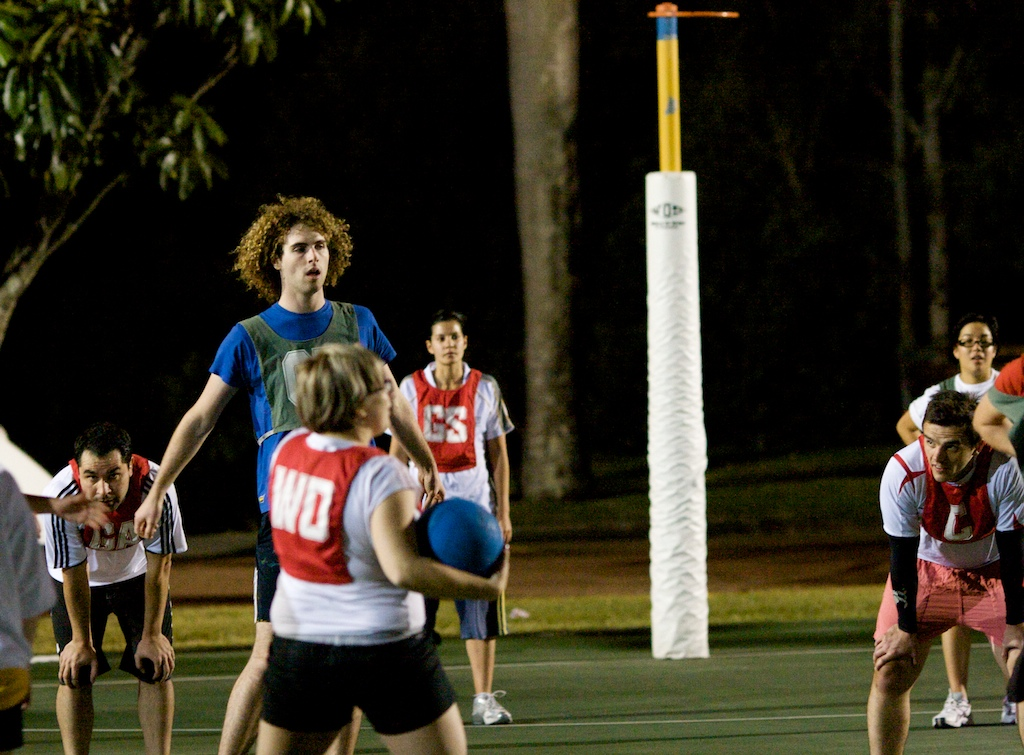
Men and women play together during a mixed netball game in Australia.

In 2004, New Zealand and Fiji sent teams to compete in the Australian Mixed and Men's National Championships. By 2006, mixed netball teams in Australia had as many male participants as rugby union.

An all-transgender netball team from Indonesia competed at the 1994 Gay Games. The team had been the Indonesian national champions.

At the Gay Games VI in Sydney in 2000, netball and volleyball were the two sports with the highest rates of transgender athletes participating. There were eight teams of indigenous players, with seven identifying as transgender. They came from places like Palm Island in northern Queensland, Samoa, Tonga and Papua New Guinea. Teams with transgender players were allowed to participate in several divisions including men's, mixed and transgender; they were not allowed to compete against women's teams.

== Variants ==
=== Indoor netball ===
Indoor Netball, 2014

Indoor netball is a variation of netball, played exclusively indoors, in which the playing court is often surrounded on each side and overhead by a net. The net prevents the ball from leaving the court, permitting faster play by reducing playing stoppages.

Different forms of indoor netball exist. In a seven-per-side version called action netball, seven players per team play most standard rules, except a game is split into fifteen-minute halves around a three-minute break. This version is played in Australia, New Zealand, South Africa and England.

A six-per-side version of the sport is also played in New Zealand. Two Centres per team can play in the whole court except the shooting circles; the remaining attacking and defending players are each restricted to one half of the court, including the shooting circles. The attacking and Centre players may shoot from outside the shooting circle for a two-point goal.

A five-per-side game is also common in indoor netball. Players can move throughout the court, with the exception of the shooting circles, which are restricted to certain attacking or defending players.

=== Fast5 ===
Fast5 (originally called Fastnet) is a variation on the rules of netball designed to make games faster and more television-friendly. The World Netball Series promotes it to raise the sport's profile and attract more spectators and greater sponsorship. The game is much shorter, with each quarter lasting only six minutes and only a two-minute break between quarters. The coaches can give instructions from the sideline during play, and unlimited substitutions are allowed. Like six-per-side indoor netball, attacking players may shoot two-point goals from outside the shooting circle. Each team can separately nominate one "power play" quarter, in which each goal scored by that team is worth double points and the centre pass is taken by the team that conceded the goal.

=== Super Shot ===
A two goal super shot was established in March 2025, firstly in Australia's Suncorp super netball league in 2020. It allows teams to score two-goal shot by scoring from a dedicated area within the outer edge of the shooting circle during the last 5 minutes of each quarter. However, shooters can still decide to shoot closer to the net if they wish to.

This new rule creates closer and more competitive matches by allowing teams the opportunity to score multiple goals quickly in the last 5 minutes. For now it is only within the Super league and it won't yet be introduced to grassroots levels.

=== For children ===
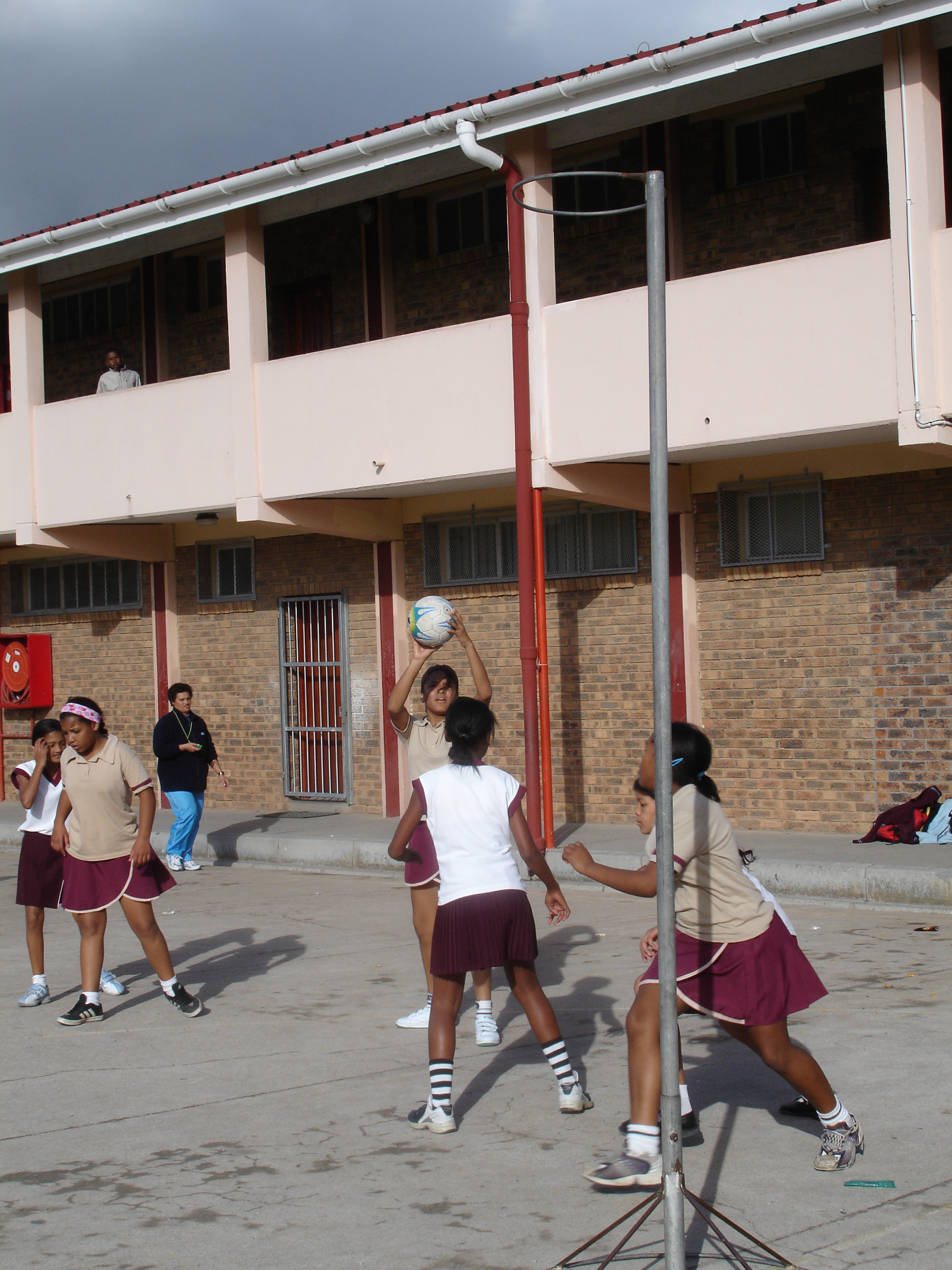
Children playing netball in South Africa

Netball has been adapted in several ways to meet children's needs. The rules for children are similar to those for adults, but various aspects of the game (such as the length of each quarter, goal height, and ball size) are modified.

Fun Net is a version of netball developed by Netball Australia for five- to seven-year-olds. It aims to improve basic netball skills using games and activities. The Fun Net program runs for 8–16 weeks. There are no winners or losers. The goal posts are 2.4 metres (7 ft 10 in) high, and a smaller ball is used.

Netball Australia also runs a modified game called Netta aimed at 8- to 11-year-olds. The goal height and ball size are the same as for adults, but players rotate positions during the game, permitting each player to play each position. Netta was created to develop passing and catching skills. Its rules permit six seconds between catching and passing the ball, instead of the three seconds permitted in the adult game. Most players under 11 play this version at netball clubs.

A version called High Five Netball is promoted by the All England Netball Association. It is aimed at 9- to 11-year-old girls and includes only five positions. The players swap positions during the game. When a player is not on the court, she is expected to help the game in some other way, such as being the timekeeper or scorekeeper. High Five Netball has four six-minute quarters.

=== Walking netball ===
Walking netball is a slower-paced version of netball designed to encourage participation by older or less fit players. The rules forbid running or jumping, and allow an extra step with the ball and 4 seconds, rather than 3, to hold the ball.

== Governance ==
The recognised international governing body of netball is World Netball, based in Manchester, England. Founded in 1960, the organisation was initially called the International Federation of Netball and Women's Basketball. World Netball is responsible for compiling world rankings for national teams, maintaining the rules for netball and organising several major international competitions.

As of April 2025, World Netball has 63 full and 12 associate national members in five regions. Each region has a World Netball regional federation.

INF region	Regional federation
Africa	Confederation of African Netball Associations
Americas	Americas Federation of Netball Associations
Asia	Netball Asia
Europe	Netball Europe
Oceania	Oceania Netball Federation

World Netball is affiliated with the General Association of International Sports Federations, the International World Games Association and the Association of IOC Recognised International Sports Federations. It is also a signatory to the World Anti-Doping Code.

== International competition ==
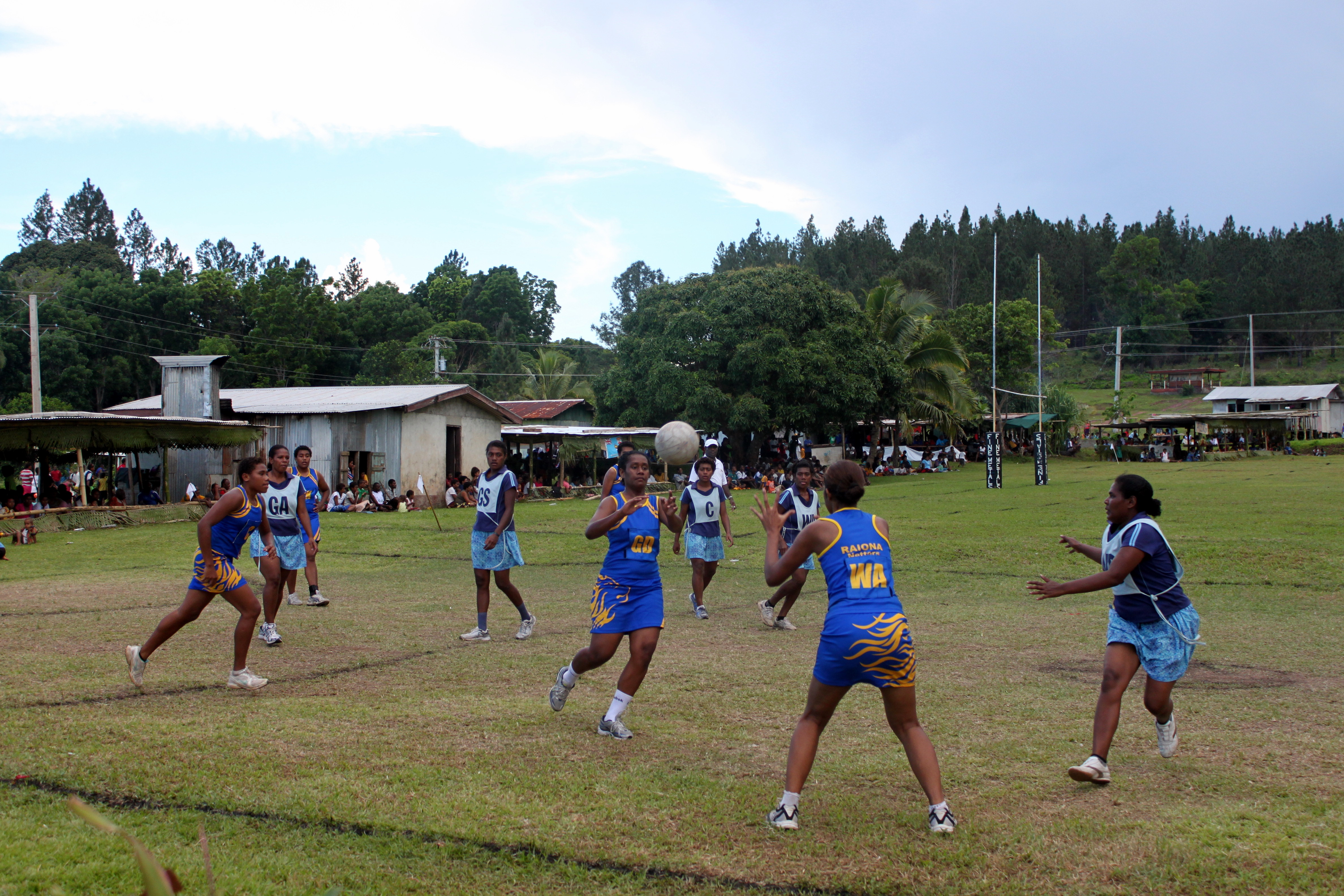
A pass takes place during a women's netball game in Fiji.

Netball is a popular participant sport in countries of the Commonwealth of Nations. Non-Commonwealth entities with full IFNA membership include Switzerland, Taiwan, Thailand, Argentina, Bermuda, the Cayman Islands and the United States, along with former Commonwealth members Zimbabwe, Ireland and Hong Kong. According to the IFNA, over 20 million people play netball in more than 80 countries. International tournaments are held among countries in each of the five IFNA regions, either annually or every four years. School leagues and national club competitions have been organised in England, Australia, New Zealand and Jamaica since the early twentieth century. Franchise-based netball leagues did not emerge until the late 1990s. These competitions sought to increase the profile of the sport in their respective countries. Despite widespread local interest, participation was largely amateur.

Netball was first included in the 1998 Commonwealth Games and has been included ever since; it is currently one of the core sports that must be contested at each edition of the Games.

The Confederation of African Netball Associations organises a major African tournament, which invites teams from Botswana, Namibia, Zambia, Malawi, South Africa, Kenya, Lesotho, Eswatini, Zimbabwe and the Seychelles to take part. The tournament is hosted by a country within the region; senior and under 21 teams compete. The tournament has served as a qualifier for the World Championships. South Africa launched a new domestic competition in 2011 called Netball Grand Series. It features eight regional teams from South Africa and is aimed at increasing the amount of playing time for players. It runs for 17 weeks and replaces the National Netball League, which was played over only two weeks. According to Proteas captain Elsje Jordaan, it was hoped that the competition would create an opportunity for players to become professional.

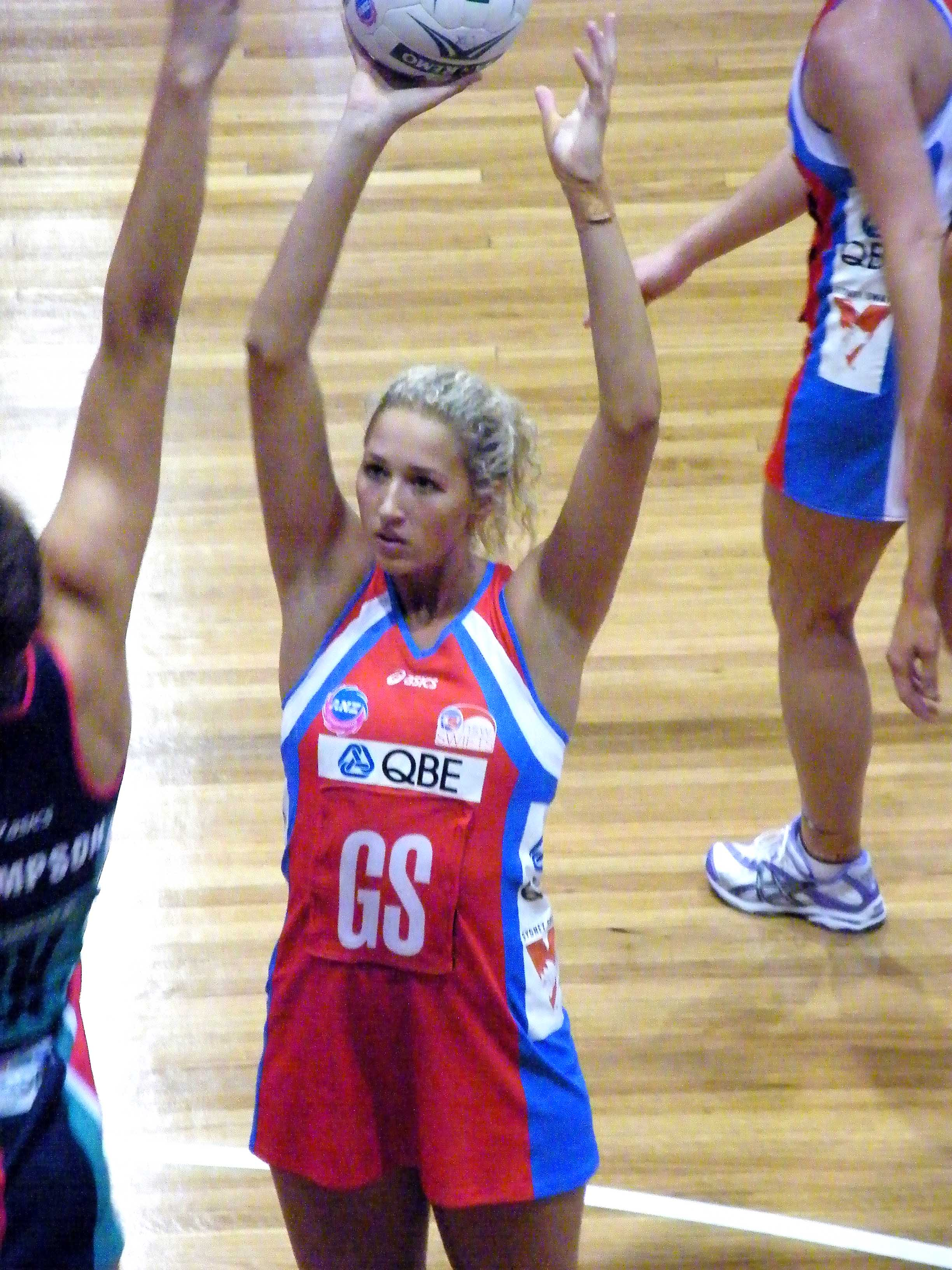
Erin Bell from the New South Wales Swifts (red) prepares to shoot for a goal against the Melbourne Vixens.

The Americas Federation of Netball Associations (AFNA) hosts two tournaments each year: the Caribbean Netball Association Under 16 Championship and the AFNA Senior Championship. The CNA championship involves two divisions of teams from the Caribbean islands. In 2010 five teams competed in two rounds of round robin matches in the Championship Division, while four teams competed in the Developmental Division. Jamaica, which has lost only once in the tournament, decided not to play the 2011 tournament. The AFNA Senior Championship includes Canada and the US along with the Caribbean nations. The tournament serves as a qualifier for the World Championship. Jamaica, with its high ranking, does not have to qualify; this leaves two spots to the other teams in the tournament.

The Asian Netball Championship is held every four years. The seventh Asian games were held in 2009 and featured Singapore, Thailand, Maldives, Taiwan, Malaysia, Sri Lanka, Hong Kong, India and Pakistan. There is also an Asian Youth Netball Championship for girls under 21 years of age, the seventh of which was held in 2010.

The major netball competition in Europe is the Netball Superleague, which features teams from England, Wales and Scotland. The league was created in 2005. Matches are broadcast on Sky Sports.

Netball has been featured at the Pacific Games, a multi-sport event with participation from 22 countries from around the South Pacific. The event is held every four years and has 12 required sports; the host country chooses the other four. Netball is not a required sport and has missed selection, particularly when former French or American territories host the games.

The ANZ Championship was a Trans-Tasman competition held between 2008 and 2016 that was broadcast on television in both New Zealand and Australia. It was contested among ten teams from Australia and New Zealand. It began in April 2008, succeeding Australia's Commonwealth Bank Trophy and New Zealand's National Bank Cup as the pre-eminent netball league in those countries. The competition was held annually between April and July, consisting of 69 matches played over 17 weeks. The ANZ Championship saw netball become a semi-professional sport in both countries, with increased media coverage and player salaries. The competition was replaced by new leagues in 2017, the Super Netball (Australia) and ANZ Premiership (New Zealand).

== Major championships ==
There are four major international netball competitions: the Netball World Cup, Netball at the Commonwealth Games, Netball Quad Series and Fast5 Netball World Series. Netball is also played at large regional multi-sport events, such as the Southeast Asian Games.

Netball's important competition is the Netball World Cup (previously known as the World Netball Championships), held every four years. It was first held in 1963 at the Chelsea College of Physical Education at Eastbourne, England, with eleven nations competing. Since its inception the competition has been dominated primarily by the Australian and New Zealand teams, which hold ten and four titles, respectively. Trinidad and Tobago is the only other team to win a championship title. That title, won in 1979, was shared with New Zealand and Australia; all three teams finished with equal points at the end of the round robin, and there were no finals.

The Fast5 Series is a competition among the top six national netball teams, as ranked by the INF World Rankings. It is organised by the INF in conjunction with the national governing bodies of the six competing nations, UK Sport, and the host city's local council. The All England Netball Association covers air travel, accommodation, food and local travel expenses for all teams, while the respective netball governing bodies cover player allowances. It is held over three days, with each team playing each other once during the first two days in a round-robin format. The four highest-scoring teams advance to the semi-finals; the winners face each other in the Grand Final. The competition features modified fastnet rules and has been likened to Twenty20 cricket and rugby sevens. A new format featuring shorter matches with modified rules was designed to make the game more appealing to spectators and television audiences. The World Netball Series was held annually in England from 2009 to 2011.

Netball's governing federation gained Olympic recognition in 1995 after 20 years of lobbying. Although it has never been played at the Summer Olympics, politicians and administrators have been campaigning unsuccessfully to have it included. Its absence from the Olympics has been seen by the netball community as a hindrance in the global growth of the game by limiting access to media attention and funding sources. Some funding sources became available with recognition in 1995, including the International Olympic Committee, national Olympic committees, national sport organisations, and state and federal governments.

== See also ==
- Injuries in netball
- List of national netball teams
- List of netball players
- Wheelchair netball
