= List of 1989 World Games medal winners =

World Games medalists list

The 1989 World Games were held in Karlsruhe, West Germany, from July 20 to 30, 1989.

== Artistic roller skating ==
Event	Gold	Silver	Bronze
Men's free skating	Sandro Guerra; Italy	David DeMotte; United States	Thomas Löhe; West Germany
Women's free skating	Raffaella Del Vinaccio; Italy	April Rex; United States	Kirsten Murphy; Australia
Pairs	United States; Larry McGrew; Tina Jerue	West Germany; Thomas Löhe; Nicole Friedel	Australia; David Morrison; Kirsten Murphy
Dance	Italy; Alberto Borsarini; Claudia Rinaldi	United States; Greg Goody; Jodee Viola	West Germany; Hendryk Schamberger; Andrea Weppelmann

== Bodybuilding ==
Event	Gold	Silver	Bronze
Men's 70 kg	Bernd Haid; West Germany	Park Young-chul; South Korea	Alfonso Gómez; Spain
Men's 80 kg	Han Dong-ki; South Korea	Ray Williams; Canada	Daniel Coussieu; France
Men's 90 kg	Henderson Thorne; Canada	Mirosław Daszkiewicz; Poland	Markus Vollert; West Germany
Men's +90 kg	Andreas Münzer; Austria	François Gay; Switzerland	Wayne Grady; United States
Women's 52 kg	Helga Popp; West Germany	Kay Caseley; Great Britain	Sharon Lewis; United States
Women's +52 kg	Christa Bauch; West Germany	Jutta Tippelt; West Germany	Claudia Montemaggi; Italy

== Bowling ==
Event	Gold	Silver	Bronze
Men's singles	Ma Ying-chieh; Chinese Taipei	Darold Meisel; United States	Hendro Pratono; Indonesia
Women's singles	Jane Amlinger; Canada	Arianne Cerdeña; Philippines	Patty Ann; United States
Mixed doubles	Chinese Taipei; Ma Ying-chieh; Huang Yuen-yue	Philippines; Jorge Fernandez; Arianne Cerdeña	West Germany; Wolfgang Strupf; Michaela Viol

== Field archery ==
Event	Gold	Silver	Bronze
Men's recurve	Francis Notenboom; Belgium	Jay Barrs; United States	Ole Gammelgaard; Denmark
Men's barebow	Wolfgang Sedmak; Austria	Jarmo Hilli; Finland	Cesare Rampi; Italy
Women's recurve	Catherine Pellen; France	Ursula Sedmak; Austria	Lise-Lotte Svensson; Sweden
Women's barebow	Nadine Visconti; France	Giuseppina Meini; Italy	Clara Admiraal; Netherlands

== Finswimming ==
Event	Gold	Silver	Bronze
Men's 100 m surface	Sergey Akhapov; Soviet Union	Konstantin Kudriaev; Soviet Union	Róbert Gyors; Hungary
Men's 200 m surface	Sergey Akhapov; Soviet Union	Konstantin Kudriaev; Soviet Union	Christian Molenaar; West Germany
Men's 400 m surface	Konstantin Kudriaev; Soviet Union	Sergey Akhapov; Soviet Union	Federico Ruggeri; Italy
Men's 50 m apnoea	Oleg Ananiev; Soviet Union	Gennady Syssoev; Soviet Union	Dierk Kraft; West Germany
Men's 100 m immersion	Liang Jun; China	Oleg Ananiev; Soviet Union	Gennady Syssoev; Soviet Union
Men's 4 × 100 m surface relay	Soviet Union; Sergey Akhapov; Oleg Ananiev; Konstantin Kudriaev; Gennady Syssoev	West Germany; Carsten Grützmacher; Dierk Kraft; Christian Molenaar; Lars Nipken	China; Liang Jun; Shang Yong; Shao Zefa; Wang Hui
Men's 4 × 200 m surface relay	Soviet Union; Sergey Akhapov; Oleg Ananiev; Konstantin Kudriaev; Gennady Syssoev	West Germany; Carsten Grützmacher; Dierk Kraft; Christian Molenaar; Lars Nipken	Hungary; Zoltán Berekméri; Róbert Gyors; Tamás Holhos; Jenő Szabó
Women's 100 m surface	Larisa Butenko; Soviet Union	Xie Fang; China	Tatiana Melnikova; Soviet Union
Women's 200 m surface	Tatiana Melnikova; Soviet Union	Elena Sadovik; Soviet Union	Éva Fabó; Hungary
Women's 400 m surface	Tatiana Melnikova; Soviet Union	Éva Fabó; Hungary	Elena Sadovik; Soviet Union
Women's 50 m apnoea	Larisa Butenko; Soviet Union	Zheng Shiyu; China	Svetlana Frolova; Soviet Union
Women's 100 m immersion	Xie Fang; China	Zheng Shiyu; China	Svetlana Frolova; Soviet Union
Women's 4 × 100 m surface relay	Soviet Union; Larisa Butenko; Svetlana Frolova; Tatiana Melnikova; Elena Sadovik	China; Pan Hui; Xie Fang; Zheng Shan; Zheng Shiyu	Hungary; Éva Fabó; Rita Felek; Ildikó Magyar; Katalin Tóth
Women's 4 × 200 m surface relay	Soviet Union; Larisa Butenko; Svetlana Frolova; Tatiana Melnikova; Elena Sadovik	China; Pan Hui; Xie Fang; Zheng Shan; Zheng Shiyu	Hungary; Éva Fabó; Rita Felek; Ildikó Magyar; Katalin Tóth

== Fistball ==
Event	Gold	Silver	Bronze
Men	West Germany; Stefan Lebert; Udo Mehle; Ulrich Richter; Dirk Schachtsiek; Uwe Schäfer; Udo Schulz; Frank Thume; Werner Weghorn	Brazil; Carlos Dillenburg; Gastão Englert; Gilberto Ferrarini; Jaime Fleck; Cláudio Fontes; Marcos Schmidt; Carlos Süffert; Jorge Süffert	Austria; Reinhold Aichbauer; Ernst Almhofer; Adolf Haslbauer; Klaus Oberhumer; Elias Penz; Erich Stratjel; Dietmar Winterleitner; Walter Zöttl

== Indoor cycling ==
Event	Gold	Silver	Bronze
Men's artistic singles	Harry Bodmer; West Germany	Roland Fleisch; Austria	Hermann Martens; Switzerland
Men's artistic pair	West Germany; Andreas Weil; Sascha Weil	Switzerland; Jürg Girschweiler; Andreas Jeker	Austria; Markus Bachmann; Dietmar Entner
Men's cycle ball	West Germany; Jürgen King; Werner King	Czechoslovakia; Miroslav Berger; Miroslav Kratochvíl	Switzerland; Peter Kern; Martin Zinser
Women's artistic singles	Heike Marklein; West Germany	Jana Horáčková; Czechoslovakia	Marianne Martens; Switzerland
Women's artistic pair	Portugal; Carmen Carvalho; Ivonne Carvalho	Czechoslovakia; Edita Jelínková; Lenka Kosová	West Germany; Martina Heimpel; Hildegard Wahl

== Inline speed skating ==
Event	Gold	Silver	Bronze
Men's 300 m time trial	Luca Antoniel; Italy	Oscar Galliazzo; Italy	Doug Glass; United States
Men's 1500 m sprint	Dante Muse; United States	Giuseppe De Persio; Italy	Tony Hanley; Australia
Men's 5000 m mass start	Tony Muse; United States	Dante Muse; United States	Tony Keefe; Australia
Men's 10000 m points	Dante Muse; United States	Tony Hanley; Australia	Giuseppe De Persio; Italy
Men's 20000 m elimination	Dante Muse; United States	Olivier Babonneau; France	Pascal Gravouil; France
Women's 300 m time trial	Barbara Fischer; West Germany	Anne Titze; West Germany	Nadia Meerkens; Belgium
Women's 1500 m sprint	Francesca Monteverde; Italy	Antonella Mauri; Italy	Luana Pilia; Italy
Women's 3000 m mass start	Luana Pilia; Italy	Antonella Mauri; Italy	Francesca Monteverde; Italy
Women's 5000 m points	Antonella Mauri; Italy	Francesca Monteverde; Italy	Luana Pilia; Italy
Women's 10000 m elimination	Antonella Mauri; Italy	Francesca Monteverde; Italy	Luana Pilia; Italy

== Karate ==
Event	Gold	Silver	Bronze
Men's kata	Tsuguo Sakamoto; Japan	Dario Marchini; Italy	Pasquale Acri; Italy
Men's kata	Tsuguo Sakamoto; Japan	Dario Marchini; Italy	Tomoyuki Aihara; Japan
Men's kumite 60 kg	Stein Rønning; Norway	Nicola Simmi; Italy	Shinichi Hasegawa; Japan
Men's kumite 60 kg	Stein Rønning; Norway	Nicola Simmi; Italy	Abdu Shaher; Great Britain
Men's kumite 65 kg	Janne Timonen; Finland	Reginaldo Doran; Netherlands	Francesco Muffato; Italy
Men's kumite 65 kg	Janne Timonen; Finland	Reginaldo Doran; Netherlands	Jesús Juan Rubio; Spain
Men's kumite 70 kg	Jörg Reuß; West Germany	William Thomas; Great Britain	Yoshimiro Anzai; Japan
Men's kumite 70 kg	Jörg Reuß; West Germany	William Thomas; Great Britain	Appie Echteld; Netherlands
Men's kumite 75 kg	Toni Dietl; West Germany	Djim Doula; Switzerland	Ko Hayashi; Japan
Men's kumite 75 kg	Toni Dietl; West Germany	Djim Doula; Switzerland	Kosta Sariyannis; West Germany
Men's kumite 80 kg	Gianluca Guazzaroni; Italy	Kemal Aktepe; Netherlands	Sven Mohnssen; West Germany
Men's kumite 80 kg	Gianluca Guazzaroni; Italy	Kemal Aktepe; Netherlands	Ralf Wintergerst; West Germany
Men's kumite +80 kg	Claudio Guazzaroni; Italy	Ralf Brachmann; West Germany	Ian Cole; Great Britain
Men's kumite +80 kg	Claudio Guazzaroni; Italy	Ralf Brachmann; West Germany	Juan Hernández; Spain
Men's kumite openweight	Claudio Guazzaroni; Italy	Yasumasa Shimizu; Japan	Marc Pyrée; France
Men's kumite openweight	Claudio Guazzaroni; Italy	Yasumasa Shimizu; Japan	Jürgen Möldner; West Germany
Women's kata	Yuki Mimura; Japan	Hisami Yokoyama; Japan	Simone Schreiner; West Germany
Women's kumite 53 kg	Catherine Girardet; France	Gerlinde Bude; West Germany	Shirley Graham; Great Britain
Women's kumite 53 kg	Catherine Girardet; France	Gerlinde Bude; West Germany	Yuko Hasama; Japan
Women's kumite 60 kg	Brigitte Thäle; West Germany	Annette Bailey; Great Britain	Akemi Kimura; Japan
Women's kumite 60 kg	Brigitte Thäle; West Germany	Annette Bailey; Great Britain	Junko Kurata; Japan
Women's kumite +60 kg	Catherine Belrhiti; France	Marie-Ange Legros; France	Diane Reilly; Great Britain
Women's kumite +60 kg	Catherine Belrhiti; France	Marie-Ange Legros; France	Simone Schreiner; West Germany

== Korfball ==
Event	Gold	Silver	Bronze
Mixed	Netherlands; Jan de Jager; Tjeerd de Jong; Mireille Fortuin; Aegle Frieswijk; Hans Heemskerk; Koos Rodenburg; Marja Schaap; Ron Steenbergen; Jacqueline van Beek; Jeanette van Beek; Margrita van der Kolk; Bram van der Zee; Hanneke van Eck; Alice van Geffen	Belgium; Jerry Aerts; Nancy Baele; Ivo Goossens; Frank Hardies; Guy Junes; Nicole Lenaerts; Marc Mattheyses; Sonja Roels; Anne Schuddinck; Adriaan Van Bavel; Martine Van den Eynde; Anne Van Gils; Viviane Verbeeck; Wim Verhoeven	West Germany; Jörg Baly; Marianne Büsing; Thorsten Cramer; Heike Dittrich; Klaus-Dieter Dittrich; Hans-Georg Felder; Martina Friebe; Gabriele Gunkel; Thomas Kupka; Christiane Reinhard; Michael Reinold; Gudrun Schade; Udo Schade; Eva Spille

== Lifesaving ==
Event	Gold	Silver	Bronze
Men's 200 m obstacle	Manfred Köder; West Germany	Pierre-Charles Cocu; France	Pietro Voltan; Italy
Men's 50 m manikin carry	Pietro Voltan; Italy	Marcello Saporiti; Italy	Yury Dudnikov; Soviet Union
Men's 100 m manikin carry fins	Mauro Bertolini; Italy	Pietro Voltan; Italy	Walter Verberght; Belgium
Men's 100 m rescue medley	Pietro Voltan; Italy	Marcello Saporiti; Italy	Pierre-Charles Cocu; France
Men's individual overall	Pietro Voltan; Italy	Pierre-Charles Cocu; France	Marcello Saporiti; Italy
Men's 4 × 25 m manikin carry relay	Italy; Mauro Bertolini; Marcello Saporiti; Massimiliano Tramontana; Pietro Voltan	Soviet Union; Yury Dudnikov; Yury Gusovsky; German Mikhailov; Ilia Putchkovski	West Germany; Jens Keil; Manfred Köder; Wolfgang Resch; Jörg Rossen
Men's 4 × 50 m medley relay	Italy; Mauro Bertolini; Marcello Saporiti; Massimiliano Tramontana; Pietro Voltan	Soviet Union; Yury Dudnikov; Yury Gusovsky; German Mikhailov; Ilia Putchkovski	West Germany; Jens Keil; Manfred Köder; Wolfgang Resch; Jörg Rossen
Men's 4 × 50 m rescue tube relay	West Germany; Jens Keil; Manfred Köder; Wolfgang Resch; Jörg Rossen	Soviet Union; Yury Dudnikov; Yury Gusovsky; German Mikhailov; Ilia Putchkovski	Italy; Mauro Bertolini; Marcello Saporiti; Massimiliano Tramontana; Pietro Voltan
Women's 200 m obstacle	Cristina Bernardini; Italy	Elena Novozhilova; Soviet Union	Sigrid Huygen; Belgium
Women's 50 m manikin carry	Natalia Gusovskaya; Soviet Union	Antje Hole; West Germany	Svetlana Romanova; Soviet Union
Women's 100 m manikin carry fins	Elena Novozhilova; Soviet Union	Concepción Escatllar; Spain	Bettina Lange; West Germany
Women's 100 m rescue medley	Antje Hole; West Germany	Cristina Bernardini; Italy	Natalia Gusovskaya; Soviet Union
Women's individual overall	Cristina Bernardini; Italy	Elena Novozhilova; Soviet Union	Bettina Lange; West Germany
Women's 4 × 25 m manikin carry relay	Italy; Cristina Bernardini; Michela Giomini; Cristina Gnassi; Paola Tabacci	Soviet Union; Natalia Gusovskaya; Elena Novozhilova; Svetlana Romanova; Marina Roslankina	West Germany; Antje Hole; Birgit Hole; Tanja Köder; Bettina Lange
Women's 4 × 50 m medley relay	Soviet Union; Natalia Gusovskaya; Elena Novozhilova; Svetlana Romanova; Marina Roslankina	Italy; Cristina Bernardini; Michela Giomini; Cristina Gnassi; Paola Tabacci	West Germany; Antje Hole; Birgit Hole; Tanja Köder; Bettina Lange
Women's 4 × 50 m rescue tube relay	Italy; Cristina Bernardini; Michela Giomini; Cristina Gnassi; Paola Tabacci	Soviet Union; Natalia Gusovskaya; Elena Novozhilova; Svetlana Romanova; Marina Roslankina	West Germany; Antje Hole; Birgit Hole; Tanja Köder; Bettina Lange

== Netball ==
Event	Gold	Silver	Bronze
Women	New Zealand; Sharon Burridge; Julie Carter; Robin Dillimore; Sandra Edge; Tracy Eyrl; Rita Fatialofa; Annette Heffernan; April Ieremia; Ana Noovao; Waimarama Taumaunu; Julie Townsend; Louisa Wall	Australia; Nicole Cusack; Carissa Dalwood; Michelle den Dekker; Keeley Devery; Sally Ironmonger; Jenny Kennett; Sue Kenny; Jennie Longhurst; Lisa Wilson; Vicki Wilson	England; Joan Bryan; Sheila Edwards; Sandra Fairweather; Karen Fenlon; Alison Keyte; Kendra Lowe; Fiona Murtagh; Trudy Papafio; Jesslyn Parkes; Alison Paton; Lucia Sdao; Sally Young

== Pétanque ==
Event	Gold	Silver	Bronze
Men's triples	France; Didier Choupay; Christian Fazzino; Daniel Voisin	Algeria; Abdelkader Hassas; Belaziz Merrizzi; Yazid Triaki	Luxembourg; Angelo Calisti; Bruno Galafate; Charles Weibel
Women's doubles	Belgium; Isabelle Dujacquier; Françoise Dupont	Great Britain; Claire Scott; Barbara Sharratt	Spain; Jerónima Ballesta; Carmen Giménez

== Powerlifting ==
Event	Gold	Silver	Bronze
Men's lightweight	Ventje Male; Indonesia	Hiroyuki Isagawa; Japan	Nanda Talambanua; Indonesia
Men's middleweight	Ausby Alexander; United States	Floriano Domenici; Italy	Mike Barber; United States
Men's heavyweight	Tony Stevens; Great Britain	Johnny Melander; Sweden	Jean-Pierre Brulois; France
Women's lightweight	Anna-Liisa Prinkkala; Finland	Hisako Yoshida; Japan	Rekha Mal; India
Women's middleweight	Joy Burt; Canada	Silvana Bollmann; West Germany	Jenny Hunter; Great Britain
Women's heavyweight	Liz Odendaal; Netherlands	Sumita Laha; India	Judy Oakes; Great Britain

== Roller hockey ==
Event	Gold	Silver	Bronze
Men	Portugal	Spain	Italy

== Taekwondo ==
Event	Gold	Silver	Bronze
Men's 50 kg	Shin Jae-hyun; South Korea	Mohammad Sari Al-Zoabi; Jordan	Yefi Triaji; Indonesia
Men's 50 kg	Shin Jae-hyun; South Korea	Mohammad Sari Al-Zoabi; Jordan	Javier Argudo; Spain
Men's 54 kg	Jung Dong-hyun; South Korea	Firas Al-Jayousi; Jordan	Ramazan Doğan; Turkey
Men's 54 kg	Jung Dong-hyun; South Korea	Firas Al-Jayousi; Jordan	Reinhard Langer; West Germany
Men's 58 kg	Cho Young-nam; South Korea	José Ángel Casado; Spain	Farouk Khaled; Egypt
Men's 58 kg	Cho Young-nam; South Korea	José Ángel Casado; Spain	Aydoğan Kondu; Turkey
Men's 64 kg	Kim Byong-cheol; South Korea	Ahmet Ercan; Turkey	Clayton Barber; United States
Men's 64 kg	Kim Byong-cheol; South Korea	Ahmet Ercan; Turkey	Bernhard Güntner; West Germany
Men's 70 kg	Park Se-jin; South Korea	Georg Streif; West Germany	Hüseyin Kahraman; Turkey
Men's 70 kg	Park Se-jin; South Korea	Georg Streif; West Germany	Garth Cooley; United States
Men's 76 kg	Jin Jung-woo; South Korea	Dirk Nadolny; West Germany	Lam Ting; Indonesia
Men's 76 kg	Jin Jung-woo; South Korea	Dirk Nadolny; West Germany	Alejandro Caballé; Spain
Men's 83 kg	Kong Doo-hwan; South Korea	Markus Woznicki; West Germany	Ammar Fahed Sbeihi; Jordan
Men's 83 kg	Kong Doo-hwan; South Korea	Markus Woznicki; West Germany	Michael Pejo; United States
Men's +83 kg	Michael Arndt; West Germany	Yahia Rashwan; Egypt	Juan Devis; Spain
Men's +83 kg	Michael Arndt; West Germany	Yahia Rashwan; Egypt	Ali Şahin; Turkey
Women's 47 kg	Wu Shan-chen; Chinese Taipei	Ginean Hatter; United States	Anita van der Pas; Netherlands
Women's 47 kg	Wu Shan-chen; Chinese Taipei	Ginean Hatter; United States	Park Eun-mi; South Korea
Women's 55 kg	Chen Jiun-feng; Chinese Taipei	Raquel Palacios; Spain	Jamie Kitchell; Canada
Women's 55 kg	Chen Jiun-feng; Chinese Taipei	Raquel Palacios; Spain	Park Kyung-suk; South Korea
Women's 65 kg	Sonny Seidel; West Germany	Jessica González; Mexico	Park Kyung-hee; South Korea
Women's 65 kg	Sonny Seidel; West Germany	Jessica González; Mexico	Elena Navaz; Spain
Women's +65 kg	Marcia King; Canada	Sharon Jewell; United States	Jang Che-oh; South Korea
Women's +65 kg	Marcia King; Canada	Sharon Jewell; United States	Angelika Biegger; West Germany

== Trampoline gymnastics ==
Event	Gold	Silver	Bronze
Men's individual	Richard Cobbing; Great Britain	Fabrice Schwertz; France	Amadeus Regenbrecht; West Germany
Men's synchro	West Germany; Michael Kuhn; Ralf Pelle	Denmark; Anders Christiansen; John Hansen	Australia; Michael Johnston; Adrian Wareham
Men's tumbling	Jon Beck; United States	Pascal Éouzan; France	Christophe Lambert; France
Women's individual	Andrea Holmes; Great Britain	Hiltrud Roewe; West Germany	Sandra Siwinna; West Germany
Women's synchro	Great Britain; Sachelle Halford; Andrea Holmes	Australia; Liz Jensen; Lisa Newman-Morris	West Germany; Gabi Bahr; Hiltrud Roewe
Women's tumbling	Chrystel Robert; France	Michelle Mara; United States	Melanie Bugg; United States

== Tug of war ==
Event	Gold	Silver	Bronze
Men's outdoor 640 kg	Switzerland; Ueli Kaiser; Andreas Murer; Hans Odermatt; Peter Odermatt; Werner Odermatt; Alois Schuler; Bruno Villiger; Markus Zimmermann	Ireland; Seamus Greenan; Bill Kehoe; Dermot Kehoe; James Kehoe; Martin Kehoe; Patrick Kehoe; William Kehoe; Ben McCrudden	Great Britain
Men's outdoor 720 kg	Great Britain; Pat Mulhern; Aidein Reilly; Kevin Reilly; Mike Reilly; Paddy Reilly; Sean Reilly; Brian Rose; Tom Rowlands	Switzerland; Joe Buckart; Andreas Murer; Peter Odermatt; Werner Odermatt; Bruno Villiger; Hans Villiger; Bruno Vogler; Markus Zimmermann	Ireland; Bill Kehoe; James Kehoe; Laurence Kehoe; Martin Kehoe; Patrick Kehoe; William Kehoe; Tom Kilbride; Billy Wall

== Water skiing ==
Event	Gold	Silver	Bronze
Men's jump	J. D. Wiswall; United States	Karl Ahamer; Austria	Andrew Rooke; Great Britain
Men's slalom	Patrice Martin; France	Marco Bettosini; Switzerland	Shawn Bronson; Great Britain
Men's tricks	Patrice Martin; France	Paul Studd; Great Britain	Andrew Rooke; Great Britain
Women's jump	Kim DeMacedo; Canada	Britta Grebe; Austria	Claudia Gusenbauer; Austria
Women's slalom	Philippa Roberts; Great Britain	Kim DeMacedo; Canada	Valérie Bedoni; Switzerland
Women's tricks	Kim DeMacedo; Canada	Philippa Roberts; Great Britain	Claudia Gusenbauer; Austria
