= Netball at the World Games =

International netball competition

- Founded: 1985
- Most recent champion: Australia (1st title)
- Most titles: New Zealand (2 titles)
- Website: www.theworldgames.org

Netball at the World Games was played on three occasions between 1985 and 1993. New Zealand were gold medallists in 1985 and 1989 while Australia were gold medallists in 1993. World Netball remains a member of the International World Games Association.

== Tournaments ==
Games	Gold	Silver	Bronze
1985	New Zealand	Australia	Jamaica
1989	New Zealand	Australia	England
1993	Australia	New Zealand	Jamaica

== Medalists ==
=== 1985 ===
Gold	Silver	Bronze
New Zealand; Coach: Lois Muir	Australia; Coach: Pamela Barham	Jamaica; Coach:
Rita Fatialofa; Tracey Fear; Margaret Forsyth; Leigh Gibbs; Annette Heffernan; Karen Henrikson; Sandra Mallet; Margharet Matenga; Rhonda Meads; Lyn Parker (c); Waimarama Taumaunu; Julie Townsend	Anne Sargeant (c); Julie Francou (vc); Dianne Cleveland; Michelle Fielke; Monica Pukallis; Keeley Devery; Roselee Jencke; Jane Searle; Sue Hawkins; Vicki Wilson; Debbie Johnson	Avadne Anglin; Valerie Balke; Pauline Burton; Janet Guy; Janet Johnson; Brenda Khouri; Marva Lindsay; Patricia McDonald; Joan Oldacre; Karlene Roese; Sharon Taylor

=== 1989 ===
Gold	Silver	Bronze
New Zealand; Coach: Lyn Parker	Australia; Coach: Wilma Shakespear	England; Coach: Betty Galsworthy
Sharon Burridge; Julie Carter; Robin Dillimore; Sandra Edge; Tracy Eyrl-Shortland; Rita Fatialofa; Annette Heffernan; April Ieremia; Ana Noovao; Waimarama Taumaunu (c); Julie Townsend; Louisa Wall	Nicole Cusack; Carissa Dalwood; Keeley Devery; Michelle Fielke (c); Sally Ironmonger; Jenny Kennett; Sue Kenny; Jennie Longhurst; Lisa Wilson; Vicki Wilson	Joan Bryan; Sheila Bryne (Edwards); Sandra Fairweather; Karen Fenlon; Anne Fooks; Alison Keyte (Spinks); Kendra Slawinski; Fiona Murtagh; Trudy Papafio; Jesslyn Parkes; Alison Paton; Lucia Sdao; Sally Young (Fountain)

=== 1993 ===
Gold	Silver	Bronze
Australia; Coach: Joyce Brown	New Zealand; Coach: Lyn Parker	Jamaica; Coach: Maureen Hall
Jenny Borlase; Nicole Cusack; Carissa Dalwood; Keeley Devery; Liz Ellis; Michelle Fielke (c); Kathryn Harby; Sue Kenny; Simone McKinnis; Shelley O'Donnell; Catriona Wagg; Vicki Wilson	Julie Carter (c); Tanya Cox; Robin Dillimore; Margaret Foster; Sheryl George; Sonya Hardcastle; Joan Hodson; Bernice Mene; Leilani Read; Teresa Tairi; Carron Topping; Linda Vagana	Charmaine Aldridge; Angeline Campbell; Karen Clarke; Connie Francis; Ann-Marie Grant; Karlene Hamilton; Marva Lindsay (c); Jennifer McDonald; Patricia McDonald; Oberon Pitterson; Natalie Tucker; Andrea Watson
