= Netball at the 1989 World Games =

International netball tournament

Tournament details
- Host country: Germany
- City: Karlsruhe
- Dates: 24–27 July 1989
- Teams: 6
- TV partner: Eurosport

Final positions
- Champions: New Zealand
- Runners-up: Australia
- Third place: England

The Netball tournament at the 1989 World Games was played in Karlsruhe, Germany between 24 and 27 July. It featured Australia, the Cook Islands, England, Fiji, New Zealand and Scotland. With a team coached by Lyn Parker and captained by Waimarama Taumaunu, New Zealand won the tournament, winning all five matches they played.

== Teams, head coaches and captains ==
Team	Head coach	Captain
Australia	Wilma Shakespear	Michelle Fielke
Cook Islands		
England	Betty Galsworthy	
Fiji		
New Zealand	Lyn Parker	Waimarama Taumaunu
Scotland		

Notes

- ^1 Trinidad and Tobago withdrew late from the tournament. They were subsequently suspended by the International Federation of Netball Associations. As a result, they missed the 1990 Caribbean Netball Championship which served as a qualifier the 1991 World Netball Championships. In turn they also missed out on the latter tournament.

== Matches ==
=== Round 1 ===
24 July 1989	England	37–21	Cook Islands

24 July 1989	Australia	62–18	Fiji

24 July 1989	New Zealand	58–9	Scotland

=== Round 2 ===
24 July 1989	New Zealand	58–19	Cook Islands

24 July 1989	England	52–7	Fiji

24 July 1989	Australia	49–13	Scotland

=== Round 3 ===
25 July 1989	Australia	41–29	England

25 July 1989	New Zealand	67–17	Fiji

25 July 1989	Cook Islands	38–20	Scotland

=== Round 4 ===
26 July 1989	Australia	62–22	Cook Islands

26 July 1989	Scotland	28–19	Fiji

26 July 1989	New Zealand	32–24	England

=== Round 5 ===
27 July 1989	Cook Islands	v	Fiji

27 July 1989	England	35–11	Scotland

27 July 1989	New Zealand	33–29	Australia

== Table ==
Pos	Team	P	W	D	L	GF	GA	GD	Pts
1	New Zealand	5	5	0	0	248	98	150	10
2	Australia	5	4	0	1	243	115	128	8
3	England	5	3	0	2	177	112	65	6
4	Cook Islands								
5	Scotland	5	1	0	4	81	199	−118	2
6	Fiji								

== Final Placings ==
Rank	Team
1st place, gold medalist(s)	New Zealand
2nd place, silver medalist(s)	Australia
3rd place, bronze medalist(s)	England
4	Cook Islands
5	Scotland
6	Fiji

== Medalists ==
Gold	Silver	Bronze
New Zealand; Coach: Lyn Parker	Australia; Coach: Wilma Shakespear	England; Coach: Betty Galsworthy
Sharon Burridge; Julie Carter; Robin Dillimore; Sandra Edge; Tracy Eyrl-Shortland; Rita Fatialofa; Annette Heffernan; April Ieremia; Ana Noovao; Waimarama Taumaunu (c); Julie Townsend; Louisa Wall	Nicole Cusack; Carissa Dalwood; Keeley Devery; Michelle Fielke (c); Sally Ironmonger; Jenny Kennett; Sue Kenny; Jennie Longhurst; Lisa Wilson; Vicki Wilson	Joan Bryan; Sheila Bryne (Edwards); Sandra Fairweather; Karen Fenlon; Anne Fooks; Alison Keyte (Spinks); Kendra Slawinski; Fiona Murtagh; Trudy Papafio; Jesslyn Parkes; Alison Paton; Lucia Sdao; Sally Young (Fountain)

== Gallery ==
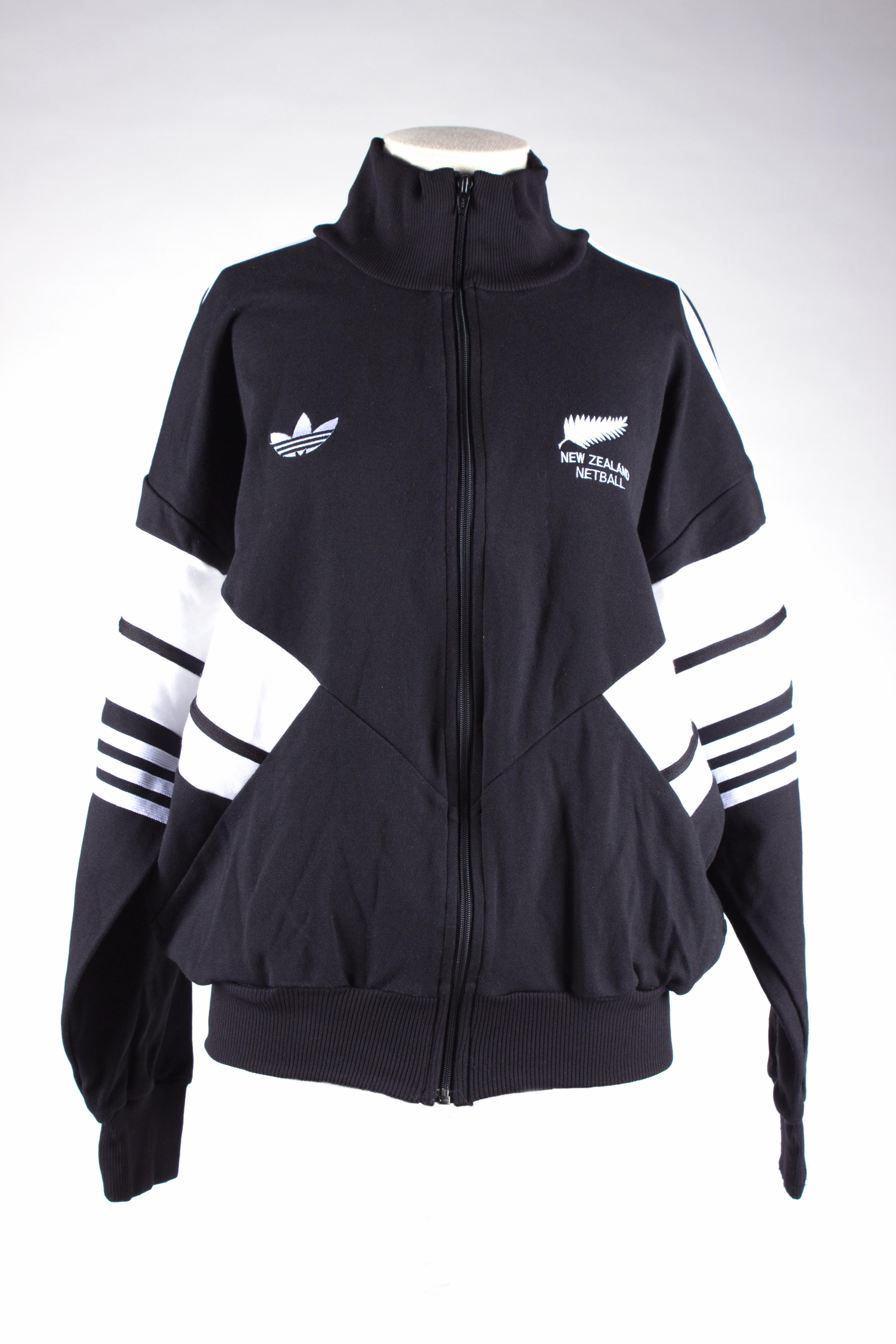
1989 World Games New Zealand national netball team tracksuit top.
