= Netball at the 1990 Commonwealth Games =

Demonstration netball test

Tournament details
- Host country: New Zealand
- City: Auckland
- Venue: Chase Stadium
- Dates: 2 February 1990

Final positions
- Champions: Australia
- Runners-up: New Zealand

Tournament statistics
- Matches played: 1
- Top scorer(s): Catriona Wagg; 29/40 (73%)

Netball at the 1990 Commonwealth Games saw New Zealand host Australia in a one-off test match played at Auckland's Chase Stadium on 2 February 1990. Netball was only a demonstration sport and no medals were awarded. With a team coached by Margeret Corbett and captained by Michelle Fielke, Australia defeated New Zealand 53–35. The New Zealand team were coached by Lyn Parker and captained by Julie Townsend. Netball would become an official Commonwealth Games sport in 1998.

== Squads ==
=== Australia ===
Australia roster
Players
Coaches

Name	Pos	DOB	Height	Club	Nat	Caps
Janet Bothwell			–
Nicole Cusack	GA,GS		–
Carissa Dalwood	C	29 November 1969 (aged 20)	1.73 m (5 ft 8 in)	Sydney Pulsar Panthers
Keeley Devery	GK		–
Sharon Finnan	GD, WD	7 September 1967 (aged 22)	–
Michelle Fielke (c)	GD	23 March 1966 (aged 23)	–	Garville
Sally Ironmonger			–
Jennifer Kennett	GS, GA		–	Garville
Sue Kenny (vc)	WA		–
Catriona Wagg	GS		–

Head coach

- Margeret Corbett

Manager:
Marilyn Melhuish
Physiotherapist:
Trish Ayres

Notes

- (c) – Captain
- (cc) – Co-captain
- (vc) – Vice-captain
- – Injury / maternity leave
- (TRP) – Temporary Replacement Player

Debuts

- Sharon Finnan and Catriona Wagg made their senior debuts for Australia.

=== New Zealand ===
New Zealand roster
Players
Coaches

Name	Pos	DOB	Height	Club	Nat	Caps
Sharon Burridge	GD, GK	9 November 1968 (aged 21)	1.90 m (6 ft 3 in)
Julie Carter	GA, WA	27 November 1965 (aged 24)	1.76 m (5 ft 9 in)
Tanya Cox	GK, GD	18 February 1967 (aged 22)	1.87 m (6 ft 2 in)
Robin Dillimore	GD, GK	27 March 1968 (aged 21)	1.89 m (6 ft 2 in)
Tracy Eyrl	GA, GS	28 May 1965 (aged 24)	1.76 m (5 ft 9 in)
Annette Heffernan	GK, GD	4 November 1962 (aged 27)	1.78 m (5 ft 10 in)
April Ieremia	GA, GS, WA	31 October 1967 (aged 22)	1.75 m (5 ft 9 in)
Ana Noovao (vc)	C, WA, WD	6 January 1968 (aged 22)	1.71 m (5 ft 7 in)
Julie Townsend (c)	GD, WD	4 April 1960 (aged 29)	1.75 m (5 ft 9 in)
Louisa Wall	WD, C	17 February 1972 (aged 17)	1.75 m (5 ft 9 in)

Head coach

- Lyn Parker

Notes

- (c) – Captain
- (cc) – Co-captain
- (vc) – Vice-captain
- – Injury / maternity leave
- (TRP) – Temporary Replacement Player

Debuts

- Tanya Cox made their senior debut for New Zealand.

== Match ==
4 February 1990	New Zealand	35–53	Australia	Chase Stadium, Auckland
4 February 1990	Scoring by quarter: 9–11, 19–27, 27–41, 35–53			Chase Stadium, Auckland
4 February 1990	Tracy Eyrl 23/31 (74%); Julie Carter 12/20 (60%)		Catriona Wagg 29/40 (73%); Nicole Cusack 24/32 (75%)	Chase Stadium, Auckland
