= Netball at the 1993 World Games =

World Games netball tournament hosted by the Netherlands

Tournament details
- Host country: Netherlands
- City: The Hague
- Venue: Houtrust Sports Centre
- Dates: 28 July–1 August 1993
- Teams: 6

Final positions
- Champions: Australia (1st title)
- Runners-up: New Zealand
- Third place: Jamaica

Tournament statistics
- Matches played: 15

The Netball tournament at the 1993 World Games was played at Houtrust Sports Centre in The Hague, Netherlands between 28 July and 1 August 1993. The tournament featured Australia, Canada, England, Jamaica, New Zealand and Wales playing a series of netball test matches. With a team coached by Joyce Brown and captained by Michelle Fielke, Australia won the tournament, winning all five of their matches. In the tournament deciding match, they defeated New Zealand 62–36. In New Zealand, the crucial match was broadcast on Television One.

== Head coaches and captains ==
Team	Head coach	Captain
Australia	Joyce Brown	Michelle Fielke
Canada	Ann Willcocks	
England	Liz Broomhead	Kendra Lowe
Jamaica	Maureen Hall	Marva Lindsay
New Zealand	Lyn Parker	Julie Carter
Wales		

== Matches ==
=== Round 1 ===
Wednesday, 28 July	New Zealand	76–22	Canada

Wednesday, 28 July	Australia	84–18	Wales

Wednesday, 28 July	Jamaica	45–31	England
	Patricia McDonald 36/44 (82%) ?? 9

=== Round 2 ===
Thursday, 29 July	England	46–26	Wales

Thursday, 29 July	Australia	74–17	Canada

Thursday, 29 July	New Zealand	60–47	Jamaica

=== Round 3 ===
Friday, 30 July	New Zealand	85–23	Wales

Friday, 30 July	Australia	64–25	England

Friday, 30 July	Jamaica	bt	Canada

=== Round 4 ===
Saturday, 31 July	Canada	52–44	Wales

Saturday, 31 July	Australia	61–53	Jamaica

Saturday, 31 July	New Zealand	57–29	England
	Carron Topping 35/42 (83%); Leilani Read 15/16 (94%); Julie Carter 7/9 (78%)		Lisa Topliss 8/21 (38%) ?? 21

=== Round 5 ===
Sunday, 1 August	Jamaica	78–28	Wales

Sunday, 1 August	England	68–29	Canada

Sunday, 1 August	Australia	62–36	New Zealand

== Table ==
Pos	Team	P	W	D	L	GF	GA	GD	Pts
1st place, gold medalist(s)	Australia	5	5	0	0	345	149	196	10
2nd place, silver medalist(s)	New Zealand	5	4	0	1	314	183	131	8
3rd place, bronze medalist(s)	Jamaica	5	3	0	2				6
4	England	5	2	0	3	199	221	-22	4
5	Canada	5	1	0	4				2
6	Wales	5	0	0	5	139	345	-206	0

== Medalists ==
Gold	Silver	Bronze
Australia; Coach: Joyce Brown	New Zealand; Coach: Lyn Parker	Jamaica; Coach: Maureen Hall
Jenny Borlase; Nicole Cusack; Carissa Dalwood; Keeley Devery; Liz Ellis; Michelle Fielke (c); Kathryn Harby; Sue Kenny; Simone McKinnis; Shelley O'Donnell; Catriona Wagg; Vicki Wilson	Julie Carter (c); Tanya Cox; Robin Dillimore; Margaret Foster; Sheryl George; Sonya Hardcastle; Joan Hodson; Bernice Mene; Leilani Read; Teresa Tairi; Carron Topping; Linda Vagana	Charmaine Aldridge; Angeline Campbell; Karen Clarke; Connie Francis; Ann-Marie Grant; Karlene Hamilton; Marva Lindsay (c); Jennifer McDonald; Patricia McDonald; Oberon Pitterson; Natalie Tucker; Andrea Watson
