= Lyn Gunson =

New Zealand netball player and coach

Personal information
- Full name: Lyn Gunson (née Parker)
- Born: 31 December 1953 (age 72) Northland, New Zealand
- Height: 5 ft 7.25 in (1.71 m)
- University: University of Otago; University of Waikato; University of Bath

Netball career
- Playing positions: WD, C, WA, GD
Years	National team	Caps
1974–1985	New Zealand	70
Coaching career
- Years: Team
- 1989–1993: New Zealand
- 1998: Bay of Plenty Magic
- 1999–2000: Waikato Bay of Plenty Magic
- 1999–2008: Team Bath
- 2002–2003: England
Medal record
Representing New Zealand
World Netball Tournament
Gold medal – first place	1979 Port of Spain	Team
Silver medal – second place	1983 Singapore	Team
Bronze medal – third place	1975 Auckland	Team
World Games
Gold medal – first place	1985 London	Team

Lyn Gunson (born 31 December 1953), also known as Lyn Parker, is a former New Zealand netball international and a former head coach of both the New Zealand and England national netball teams. She captained New Zealand when they won the 1985 World Games title and coached them when they retained the same title in 1989. In 1989 she was named New Zealand Coach of the Year. Between 1999 and 2008 Gunson also served as head coach and/or director of netball for Team Bath, guiding them to Netball Superleague titles in 2005–06 and 2006–07.

== Early life and education ==
Gunson is originally from Northland, New Zealand. In 1974 she graduated from the University of Otago with a Diploma in Physical Education. She also gained a Masters in Business Administration from the University of Waikato. Between 1995 and 1999 she also worked as a lecturer at Waikato. She has also worked as a secondary teacher and as director of the Waikato Institute for Leisure and Sport.

== Playing career ==
=== New Zealand ===
Between 1974 and 1985 Gunson made 70 senior appearances for New Zealand. She made her senior debut on 15 October 1974 against Singapore. She first captained New Zealand in 1974 during a tour of England while still aged 21. She became the permanent captain in 1978 at the age of 24. She subsequently captained New Zealand at the 1979 World Netball Tournament, when New Zealand shared the title with Australia and Trinidad and Tobago, and at the 1983 World Netball Tournament when New Zealand finished as runners-up to Australia. She continued to captain New Zealand until she retired as a player. She made her final appearance for New Zealand in the 1985 World Games final as New Zealand defeated Australia 39–37 to win the inaugural title. Her teammates while playing for New Zealand included, among others, Rita Fatialofa, Margaret Forsyth, Yvonne Willering and Waimarama Taumaunu.

Tournaments	Place
1975 World Netball Tournament	3rd place, bronze medalist(s)
1979 World Netball Tournament	1st place, gold medalist(s)
1983 World Netball Tournament	2nd place, silver medalist(s)
1985 World Games	1st place, gold medalist(s)

== Coaching career ==
=== New Zealand ===
Between 1989 and 1993 Gunson served as head coach of New Zealand. During her three years as head coach she guided New Zealand to 45 wins in 49 tests. In her debut year as coach she guided New Zealand to eight wins out of eight. This included New Zealand winning the 1989 World Games title and defeating Australia 3–0 in a home series of matches. She was subsequently named New Zealand Coach of the Year for 1989 while the New Zealand national netball team where named Team of the Year. She also served as head coach of New Zealand at the 1991 World Netball Championships. Her last tournament as head coach was the 1993 World Games.

=== Waikato Bay of Plenty Magic ===
Between 1999 and 2000 Gunson coached Waikato Bay of Plenty Magic in New Zealand's Coco-Cola Cup.

=== Team Bath ===
Between 1999 and 2008 Gunson served as head coach and/or director of netball for Team Bath. She initially arrived at the University of Bath to study for a doctorate. During the Super Cup era, she guided Team Bath to the 2004 title. As director of netball she subsequently oversaw Team Bath as they won the inaugural Netball Superleague title in 2005–06 and then retain it in 2006–07. During her time with Team Bath she helped mentor the next generation of English netball coaches, including Tamsin Greenway and Jess Thirlby. In 2015 Gunson was inducted into the University of Bath/Team Bath Hall of Fame for Sport. In 2019 Team Bath renamed the trophy awarded to the winners of their pre-season tournament after Gunson. Saracens Mavericks subsequently won the inaugural Lyn Gunson Trophy.

=== England ===
Between 2002 and 2003 Gunson served as head coach of England. She had previously served as an assistant coach. She was the England head coach at both the 2002 Commonwealth Games and 2003 World Netball Championships.

Tournaments	Team	Place
1989 World Games	New Zealand	1st place, gold medalist(s)
1990 Commonwealth Games	New Zealand	2nd
1991 World Netball Championships	New Zealand	2nd place, silver medalist(s)
1993 World Games	New Zealand	2nd place, silver medalist(s)
2002 Commonwealth Games	England	4th
2003 World Netball Championships	England	4th

=== Later years ===
In 2008 Gunson returned to New Zealand where she remained involved with netball. Between 2008 and 2011 she served as director of netball for Netball North Harbour. She later worked as a Coaching Consultant at the New Zealand Academy of Sport North Island.

== Honours ==
=== Player ===
New Zealand

- World Netball Tournament
  - Shared: 1979
  - Runners Up: 1983
- World Games
  - Winners: 1985

=== Head coach ===
New Zealand

- World Games
  - Winners: 1989
  - Runners Up: 1993
- New Zealand Team of the Year
  - Winners: 1989
- World Netball Championships
  - Runners Up: 1991

Individual

- New Zealand Coach of the Year
  - Winner: 1989

Team Bath

- Netball Superleague
  - Winners: 2005–06, 2006–07
- Super Cup
  - Winners: 2004

Awards
Preceded by Lois Muir	Halberg Awards – Coach of the Year; 1989	Succeeded by Ron Cheatley
