= Fiona Murtagh (netball) =

England netball international

Fiona Murtagh MBE
Personal information
- Full name: Fiona Murtagh
- Born: 30 April 1967 (age 59)

Netball career
- Playing positions: C, WD
| Years | Club team | Apps |
| 2001–200x | London Tornadoes | |
| Years | National team | Caps |
| 1988–200x | England | |
Medal record
Representing England
World Netball Championships
| Bronze medal – third place | 1999 Christchurch | Team |
Commonwealth Games
| Bronze medal – third place | 1998 Kuala Lumpur | Team |
World Games
| Bronze medal – third place | 1989 Karlsruhe | Team |

Fiona Murtagh MBE (born 30 April 1967) is a former England netball international. She was a member of the England teams that won bronze medals at the 1989 World Games, the 1998 Commonwealth Games and the 1999 World Netball Championships. She captained England at the 1998 Commonwealth Games. In 2000, she was appointed a Member of the Order of the British Empire.

== Playing career ==
=== Super Cup ===
During the Super Cup era, Murtagh played for London Tornadoes. She captained a Tornadoes team, that also included Amanda Newton to two Super Cup titles.

=== England ===
Murtagh was a member of the England team that won the bronze medal at the 1989 World Games. In February 1996, she captained England for the first time in a match against Northern Ireland. She subsequently captained England during a 1997 series against New Zealand and at the 1998 Commonwealth Games, when England were again bronze medallists. She also represented England at the 1999 World Netball Championships and the 2002 Commonwealth Games. In 2000 she was awarded an MBE for services to netball.

| Tournaments | Place |
|---|---|
| 1989 World Games | 3rd place, bronze medalist(s) |
| 1991 World Netball Championships | 4th |
| 1993 World Games | 4th |
| 1995 World Netball Championships | 4th |
| 1998 Commonwealth Games | 3rd place, bronze medalist(s) |
| 1999 World Netball Championships | 3rd place, bronze medalist(s) |
| 2002 Commonwealth Games | 4th |

== Assistant Coach ==
=== Galleria Mavericks ===
During the 2006–07 Netball Superleague season, Murtagh was a member the Galleria Mavericks coaching team, serving as an assistant coach and helping them reach the grand final.

=== London Pulse ===
Since 2021, Murtagh has served as an assistant coach with London Pulse.

== Honours ==
London Tornadoes

- Super Cup
  - Winners: 2001, 2003: 2
