= Fiona Murtagh =

Fiona Murtagh may refer to:

- Fiona Murtagh (netball) (born 1967), former England netball international
- Fiona Murtagh (rower) (born 1995), Irish rower
