= Warner Dearns =

Japan international rugby union player

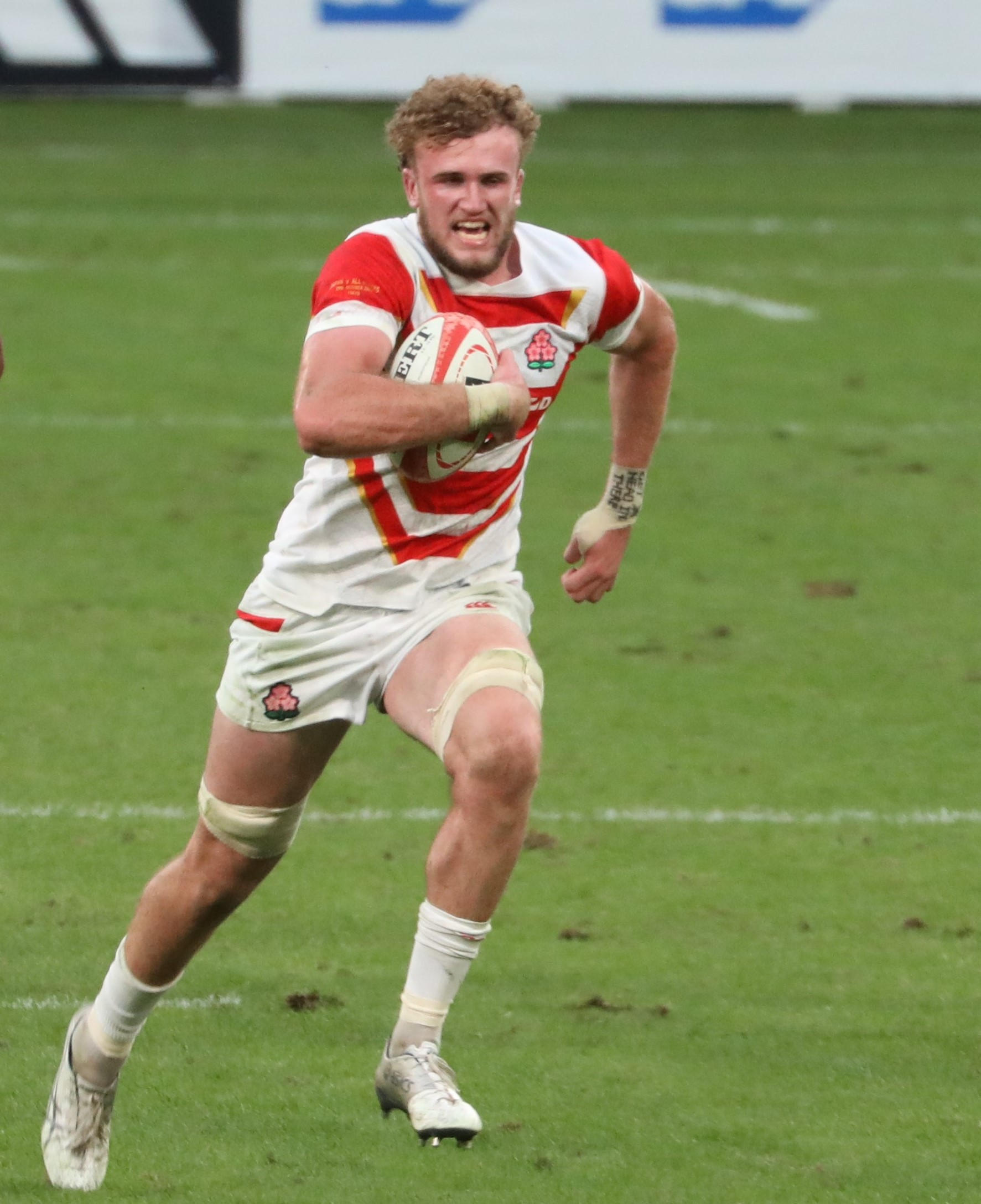
- Dearns representing Japan during the November Internationals
- Born: 11 April 2002 (age 24) Wellington, New Zealand
- Height: 2.03 m (6 ft 8 in)
- Weight: 124 kg (273 lb; 19 st 7 lb)
- School: Ryukei Kashiwa High School
- Notable relative: Tanya Dearns (mother)

Rugby union career
- Position: Lock / Number 8
- Current team: Toshiba Brave Lupus
Senior career
Years	Team	Apps	(Points)
2022–	Toshiba Brave Lupus	62	(55)
2026	Hurricanes	15	(25)
- Correct as of 15 November 2026
International career
Years	Team	Apps	(Points)
2021–	Japan	41	(75)
- Correct as of 15 November 2026

Warner Dearns (ワーナー ディアンズ, Wānā Dianzu; born 11 April 2002) is a professional rugby union player who plays as a lock for Japan Rugby League One club Toshiba Brave Lupus. Born in New Zealand but moved to Japan at the age of 14 years old as his father was appointed as a coach at NEC Green Rockets, he represents Japan at international level after qualifying on residency grounds.

== Club career ==
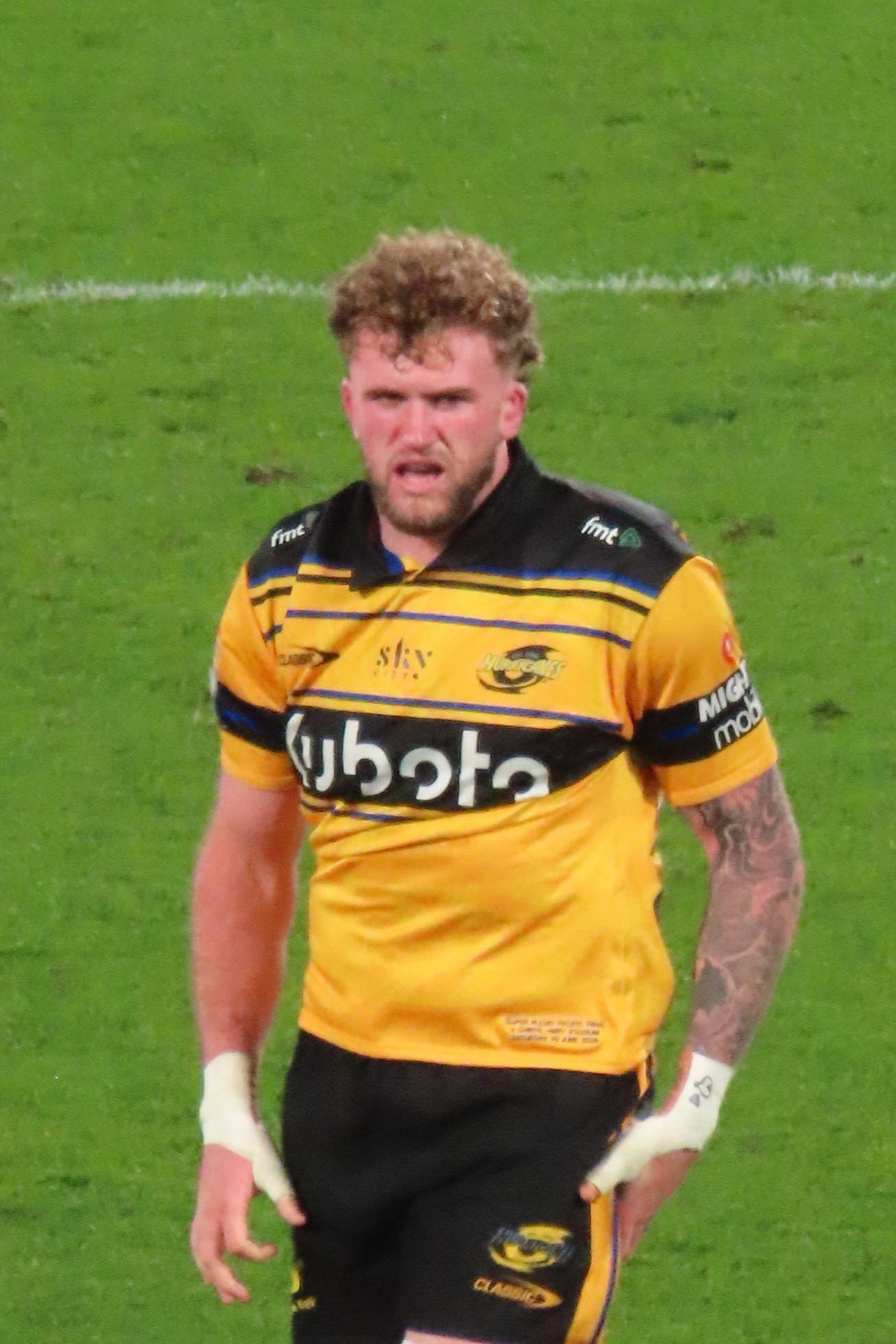
Dearns playing for the Hurricanes in the 2026 Super Rugby Pacific final

On January 8, 2022, he made his first official appearance in Japan as a starter in the first match of JAPAN RUGBY LEAGUE ONE against Tokyo Suntory Sangoliath. In this match, he became the youngest player to score a try (19 years, 8 months, 29 days), surpassing the previous Top League 2020 record (Tatsuya Fujii, Munakata Sanix Blues, 19 years, 10 months, 10 days).

In 2026, Dearns formed part of the Hurricanes squad that won the 2026 Super Rugby Pacific season. On 20 June, the Hurricanes defeated the Chiefs 60–5 in the final.

== International career ==
Dearns was called for Japan on 28 October 2021 for the 2021 end-of-year rugby union internationals. He made his debut on 13 November in the match against Portugal.

On June 25, 2022, he made his first start for Japan against Uruguay. On October 29 of the same year, he scored his first try against New Zealand.

In May 2023, he was called up again to the national squad for the 10th Rugby World Cup, but due to multiple injuries sustained in training camp, he was unable to play in the five pre-World Cup matches in Japan. However, he did represent Japan at the Rugby World Cup 2023 in France, playing in all pool matches, scoring a try in his first game vs Chile in the 79th minute.

He scored two tries against Canada on August 25, 2024, and was named Player of the Match.

In November 2026, Dearns revealed he had been approached by his birth country, New Zealand, about the possibility of playing for them after serving the mandatory 3-year stand-down period from international rugby in order to be become eligible again. He declined the offer to continue playing with Japan.

== Career honours ==
Toshiba Brave Lupus Tokyo

- Japan Rugby League One: 2023–24, 2024–25

Hurricanes

- Super Rugby: 2026
