= Leonie Leaver =

New Zealand netball player and coach

Leonie Leaver is a former New Zealand netball player who represented the New Zealand national netball team, known as the Silver Ferns, on 19 occasions. She is now a netball coach.

== Early life ==
Leonie Leaver (née Wendt) was born in Fiji. She attended Henderson High School, Auckland. She married Mark Leaver who, together with his brother Brett, played international hockey as members of the New Zealand men's national field hockey team.

== Netball career ==
Leaver played netball for the Auckland Under-19 team in 1983 and 1984, moving on to the Under-21 team in 1985 and 1986. She represented the New Zealand Young Internationals in 1985 and 1986. From 1987 to 1993 she played for Auckland in the National Provincial netball tournament, and in 1991 she was selected to play for the Silver Ferns, representing New Zealand in the 1991 World Netball Championships, where the team won a silver medal, losing 52–53 to Australia in the final. Her international career ended when she had her first child, but she returned to the game in 1996 to play for the Auckland Diamonds until 1999, when she left the game to care for her children, returning for one season in 2002. She also played at senior level and was still competing in 2017, at the World Masters Games. Her daughter, Brooke Leaver, was also a leading netball player.

== Coaching career ==
Since retiring, Leaver has held a wide range of coaching positions in the Auckland area. In 2010 she took up a position as netball coach at One Tree Hill College, a coeducational secondary school located in the district of Ellerslie in Auckland. Since 2014, she has also coached netball at Baradene College of the Sacred Heart near Auckland. In 2015, Leaver established a charity called ShoeBoxx, which aims to fight poverty by supplying children and youth with sports shoes.
