= Jenny Borlase =

Australia netball international

Jenny Borlase OAM
Personal information
- Full name: Jennifer Anne Borlase (Née: Kennett)
- Born: c. 1968 (age 57–58) South Australia
- Spouse: Darryl Borlase

Netball career
- Playing positions: GS, GA
Years	Club team	Apps
198x-198x	Eyre Academy	
198x-198x	Cummins Kapinnie Cougars	
199x-199x	Garville	
1997-1998	Adelaide Ravens	
1999	Melbourne Kestrels	
Years	National team	Caps
1989-1999	Australia	70
Coaching career
- Years: Team
- 2017–: SASI
- 2019–: Seymour College
Medal record
Representing Australia
World Netball Championships
Gold medal – first place	1991 Sydney	Team
Gold medal – first place	1995 Birmingham	Team
Gold medal – first place	1999 Christchurch	Team
Commonwealth Games
Gold medal – first place	1998 Kuala Lumpur	Team
World Games
Silver medal – second place	1989 Karlsruhe	Team
Gold medal – first place	1993 The Hague	Team

Jenny Borlase OAM, also known as Jenny Kennett, is a former Australia netball international. Between 1989 and 1999 she made 70 senior appearances for Australia. She was a member of the Australia teams that won gold medals at the 1991, 1995 and 1999 World Netball Championships, the 1993 World Games and the 1998 Commonwealth Games. At club level, Borlase played for Garville in both the South Australia state league and the Mobil Superleague and for Adelaide Ravens and Melbourne Kestrels in the Commonwealth Bank Trophy league. She also represented South Australia. Borlase was awarded the Medal of the Order of Australia in 1992. After retiring as a player, Borlase has remained involved in netball as both an administrator and coach.

== Early life and family ==
Borlase is originally from the Eyre Peninsula. She is married to Darryl Borlase, a former Australian rules footballer. The couple have three children, including footballer James Borlase and basketball player Isobel Borlase.

== Playing career ==
=== Early years ===
In her youth, Borlase, then known as Jenny Kennett played for Eyre Academy. In 1983 she was a member of the Cummins Kapinnie Cougars team that won an A grade premiership in the Great Flinders Football Netball League.

=== Garville ===
Borlase played for Garville in both the South Australia state league and the Mobil Superleague. Between 1992 and 1995 she was a member of the Garville teams that won four successive state league grand finals. She also played for Garville in two Mobil Superleague grand finals. In 1993 they finished as champions. Her team mates at Garville included Natalie Avellino and Michelle den Dekker and the team was coached by Patricia Mickan.

=== South Australia ===
Borlase also represented South Australia and captained them to a national title. ^{(Note 1)}

=== Commonwealth Bank Trophy ===
During the early Commonwealth Bank Trophy era, Borlase played for Adelaide Ravens in 1998 and Melbourne Kestrels in 1999.

=== Australia ===
Between 1989 and 1999 Borlase made 70 senior appearances for Australia. She made her senior debut on 21 May 1989 against New Zealand. She was a member of the Australia teams that won gold medals at the 1991, 1995 and 1999 World Netball Championships, the 1993 World Games and the 1998 Commonwealth Games. She was also a member the team that won a silver medal at the 1989 World Games. In 1992 Borlase, along with the rest of the gold medal winning 1991 World Netball Championship squad, were awarded the Medal of the Order of Australia.

Tournaments	Place
1989 World Games	2nd place, silver medalist(s)
1990 Commonwealth Games	1st
1991 World Netball Championships	1st place, gold medalist(s)
1993 World Games	1st place, gold medalist(s)
1995 World Netball Championships	1st place, gold medalist(s)
1998 Commonwealth Games	1st place, gold medalist(s)
1999 World Netball Championships	1st place, gold medalist(s)

== Administrator and coach ==
Administrator

Borlase served on the Netball Victoria board for three years. Between and 2008 and 2016, she served on the Netball South Australia board.

Coach

In 2015 Borlase worked with the Australian Institute of Sport, coaching netball players in the Tall Athlete Program. In 2016 and 2017 she served as a specialist coach with Adelaide Thunderbirds. In 2017 she was appointed head netball coach at the South Australian Sports Institute. In 2019 she was appointed coach of the Seymour College open A team.

== Honours ==
Australia

- World Netball Championships
  - Winners: 1991, 1995, 1999
- Commonwealth Games
  - Winners: 1998
- World Games
  - Winners: 1993
  - Runners up: 1989

Garville

- South Australia State League
  - Winners: 1992, 1993, 1994, 1995
  - Runners up: 1990, 1991, 1996
- Mobil Superleague
  - Winners: 1993
  - Runners up: 1994

== Notes ==
- ^1 Australian State Netball League or Australian National Netball Championships.
