= Garth Cooley =

American taekwondo Grandmaster

Garth Cooley was a taekwondo Grandmaster and black belt.

== Information ==
Cooley moved from Arizona to Indianapolis in junior high-school. Cooley started learning taekwondo in 1981 from Grandmaster Chul Koo Yoon to learn self-defense.

He captured his first time in 1986 when he became an Indiana state taekwondo title. Cooley won more Indiana state titles in successive years and later became an 8-time Indiana state champion. Cooley competed at the 1987 United States Olympic Festival. Cooley qualified for the US National Taekwondo team at the 1992 Olympic Team Trials. Cooley had a successful 1989 season as he became a United States National Taekwondo Champion, a member of the United States National Taekwondo team and was a United States National Collegiate Silver Medalist. Cooley represented the United States at the 1989 World Games and won the bronze medal in the Men's 70 kg division.

Cooleys 1990 season was also a successful one. Cooley again was a United States Olympic Festival Champion and again was a United States National Collegiate Silver Medalist. Cooley also was team captain of the United States National Collegiate Taekwondo team. Cooley became a United States Olympic Festival champion again in 1991 and captained the United States National Collegiate Taekwondo team in 1991.

Cooley captured his second United States National Taekwondo title in 1993 and was the captain of the United States National Taekwondo team the same year. Cooley also was awarded the United States Male Athlete of the Year award for Taekwondo in 1993. Cooley then represented the US at the 1993 World Taekwondo Championships.

1994 was Cooley's next to last year as an active taekwondo competitor. He won the bronze medal at the 1994 Pan American Taekwondo Championships, the bronze medal for taekwondo at the 1994 Goodwill Games and the bronze medal at the 1994 IOC Centenary Seoul International Taekwondo Championships.

Cooley became a full-time taekwondo teacher in 1995 at the Korea Taekwondo Academy. Cooley was awarded the 1998 Taekwondo Instructor of the Year, From 2000 to 2003, he became the Indiana State Taekwondo Association President of USTU. Cooley late became a certified International Taekwondo referee.

In 2006, Cooley represented the United States at the United States National Team Trials and made the United States National Poomsae Team and represented the United States 7 times at the World Poomsae Championships. Cooley won the gold medal at the 2013 United States Open Taekwondo Championships in poomsae.

== Personal life ==
Cooley graduated from the University of Indianapolis in Business Administration. Cooley married his wife Julia in 1994 and had two children, Grant and Jillian. Cooley worked as a waiter during most of his taekwondo career.

Garth Cooley died on March 2, 2025.
