= Vic Wilson =

Vic Wilson may refer to:

- Vic Wilson (cricketer) (1921–2008), English cricketer
- Vic Wilson (racing driver) (1931–2001), British racing driver
