= 1995 World Netball Championships =

Tournament details
- Host country: England
- Dates: 15–29 July 1995
- Teams: 27

Final positions
- Champions: Australia (7th title)
- Runner-up: South Africa
- Third place: New Zealand

The 1995 World Netball Championships was the ninth edition of the INF Netball World Cup, a quadrennial premier event in international netball. It was held in Birmingham, England and featured a record 27 teams. South Africa returned to competition after the abolition of apartheid.

Australia claimed their seventh title.

== First round ==
=== Group A ===
Pos	Team	Pld	W	D	L	GF	GA	GD	Pts
1	Australia	3	3	0	0	256	68	+133	6
2	Saint Vincent and the Grenadines	3	2	0	1	160	196	–36	4
3	Papua New Guinea	3	1	0	2	142	193	–51	2
4	Sri Lanka	3	0	0	3	112	213	–101	0

16 July	Papua New Guinea	58–45	Sri Lanka	National Indoor Arena, Birmingham

16 July	Australia	90–23	Saint Vincent and the Grenadines	National Indoor Arena, Birmingham
16 July	Scoring by half: 44–9, 46–14			National Indoor Arena, Birmingham

17 July; 16:30	Australia	84–26	Papua New Guinea	National Indoor Arena, Birmingham
17 July; 16:30	Scoring by half: 35–12, 49–14			National Indoor Arena, Birmingham

17 July; 18:15	Saint Vincent and the Grenadines	73–48	Sri Lanka	National Indoor Arena, Birmingham

18 July	Papua New Guinea	58–64	Saint Vincent and the Grenadines	National Indoor Arena, Birmingham

19 July	Australia	82–19	Sri Lanka	National Indoor Arena, Birmingham

=== Group B ===
Pos	Team	Pld	W	D	L	GF	GA	GD	Pts
1	South Africa	3	3	0	0	240	107	+133	6
2	New Zealand	3	2	0	1	258	96	+162	4
3	Namibia	3	1	0	2	111	195	–84	2
4	Cayman Islands	3	0	0	3	74	285	–211	0

17 July; 14:45	New Zealand	87–22	Namibia	National Indoor Arena, Birmingham

17 July; 17:45	Cayman Islands	22–110	South Africa	National Indoor Arena, Birmingham

18 July	New Zealand	114–15	Cayman Islands	National Indoor Arena, Birmingham

18 July	Namibia	28–71	South Africa	National Indoor Arena, Birmingham

19 July	Namibia	61–37	Cayman Islands	National Indoor Arena, Birmingham

19 July	South Africa	59–57	New Zealand	National Indoor Arena, Birmingham
19 July	Scoring by quarter: 16–17, 15–15, 17–10, 11–15			National Indoor Arena, Birmingham

=== Group C ===
Pos	Team	Pld	W	D	L	GF	GA	GD	Pts
1	Jamaica	2	2	0	0	150	81	+71	4
2	Malawi	2	1	0	1	114	117	–3	2
3	Hong Kong	2	0	0	2	76	172	–96	0

16 July	Hong Kong	37–56	Malawi	National Indoor Arena, Birmingham

18 July	Jamaica	80–29	Hong Kong	National Indoor Arena, Birmingham

19 July	Jamaica	70–52	Malawi	National Indoor Arena, Birmingham

=== Group D ===
Pos	Team	Pld	W	D	L	GF	GA	GD	Pts
1	England	3	3	0	0	212	77	+135	6
2	Barbados	3	2	0	1	166	126	+40	4
3	Northern Ireland	3	1	0	2	121	165	–44	2
4	Singapore	3	0	0	3	97	228	–131	0

15 July	England	61–29	Barbados	National Indoor Arena, Birmingham

16 July	Singapore	3–73	Barbados	National Indoor Arena, Birmingham

16 July	England	56–27	Northern Ireland	National Indoor Arena, Birmingham

17 July; 19:30	England	95–21	Singapore	National Indoor Arena, Birmingham

18 July	Northern Ireland	60–45	Singapore	National Indoor Arena, Birmingham

19 July	Barbados	64–34	Northern Ireland	National Indoor Arena, Birmingham

=== Group E ===
Pos	Team	Pld	W	D	L	GF	GA	GD	Pts
1	Cook Islands	3	3	0	0	274	94	+180	6
2	United States	3	2	0	1	133	155	–22	4
3	Malaysia	3	0	1	2	110	181	–71	1
4	Republic of Ireland	3	0	1	2	95	182	–87	1

16 July	United States	49–42	Malaysia	National Indoor Arena, Birmingham

17 July; 16:00	Cook Islands	95–29	Republic of Ireland	National Indoor Arena, Birmingham

18 July	Republic of Ireland	30–51	United States	National Indoor Arena, Birmingham

18 July	Cook Islands	96–32	Malaysia	National Indoor Arena, Birmingham

19 July	Republic of Ireland	36–36	Malaysia	National Indoor Arena, Birmingham

19 July	Cook Islands	83–33	United States	National Indoor Arena, Birmingham

=== Group F ===
Pos	Team	Pld	W	D	L	GF	GA	GD	Pts
1	Trinidad and Tobago	3	3	0	0	234	99	+135	6
2	Canada	3	2	0	1	186	135	+51	4
3	Scotland	3	1	0	2	155	170	–15	2
4	Malta	3	0	0	3	89	260	–171	0

16 July	Trinidad and Tobago	72–37	Scotland	National Indoor Arena, Birmingham

17 July; 14:15	Canada	54–43	Scotland	National Indoor Arena, Birmingham
17 July; 14:15	Scoring by half: 21–23, 33–20			National Indoor Arena, Birmingham

17 July; 17:00	Trinidad and Tobago	94–21	Malta	National Indoor Arena, Birmingham

18 July	Canada	91–24	Malta	National Indoor Arena, Birmingham

19 July	Scotland	75–44	Cayman Islands	National Indoor Arena, Birmingham

19 July	Canada	41–68	Trinidad and Tobago	National Indoor Arena, Birmingham

=== Group G ===
Pos	Team	Pld	W	D	L	GF	GA	GD	Pts
1	Samoa	3	3	0	0	230	119	+111	6
2	Antigua and Barbuda	3	2	0	1	186	161	+25	4
3	Wales	3	1	0	2	144	144	0	2
4	Bermuda	3	0	0	3	87	223	–136	0

16 July	Wales	63–33	Bermuda	National Indoor Arena, Birmingham

17 July; 15:00	Antigua and Barbuda	75–37	Bermuda	National Indoor Arena, Birmingham

17 July; 20:00	Wales	33–69	Samoa	National Indoor Arena, Birmingham

18 July	Samoa	85–30	Bermuda	National Indoor Arena, Birmingham

18 July	Antigua and Barbuda	55–48	Wales	National Indoor Arena, Birmingham

19 July	Samoa	76–56	Antigua and Barbuda	National Indoor Arena, Birmingham

== Consolation round ==
=== Group W ===
Pos	Team	Pld	W	D	L	GF	GA	GD	Pts
1	Namibia	5	5	0	0	273	202	+69	10
2	Northern Ireland	5	4	0	1	298	237	+61	8
3	Sri Lanka	5	3	0	2	251	250	+1	6
4	Scotland	5	2	0	3	231	243	−12	4
5	Bermuda	5	1	0	4	223	291	–68	2
6	Republic of Ireland	5	0	0	5	220	273	–53	0

20 July	Sri Lanka	38–48	Namibia	National Indoor Arena, Birmingham

20 July	Republic of Ireland	43–50	Bermuda	National Indoor Arena, Birmingham

21 July	Republic of Ireland	40–46	Scotland	National Indoor Arena, Birmingham

21 July	Sri Lanka	61–55	Bermuda	National Indoor Arena, Birmingham

22 July	Northern Ireland	66–49	Republic of Ireland	National Indoor Arena, Birmingham

22 July	Scotland	63–45	Bermuda	National Indoor Arena, Birmingham

23 July	Namibia	59–49	Northern Ireland	National Indoor Arena, Birmingham

23 July	Sri Lanka	49–45	Scotland	National Indoor Arena, Birmingham

24 July	Northern Ireland	59–48	Bermuda	National Indoor Arena, Birmingham

25 July	Sri Lanka	59–38	Republic of Ireland	National Indoor Arena, Birmingham

25 July	Namibia	49–40	Scotland	National Indoor Arena, Birmingham

26 July	Northern Ireland	60–37	Scotland	National Indoor Arena, Birmingham

26 July	Namibia	65–25	Bermuda	National Indoor Arena, Birmingham

27 July	Northern Ireland	64–44	Sri Lanka	National Indoor Arena, Birmingham

27 July	Republic of Ireland	50–52	Namibia	National Indoor Arena, Birmingham

=== Group X ===
Pos	Team	Pld	W	D	L	GF	GA	GD	Pts
1	Papua New Guinea	6	6	0	0	392	253	+139	12
2	Wales	6	5	0	1				10
3	Singapore	6	3	0	3				6
4	Cayman Islands	6	3	0	3				6
5	Hong Kong	6	2	0	4	279	268	+11	4
6	Malaysia	6	2	0	4	259	332	–73	4
7	Malta	6	0	0	6				0

20 July	Malaysia	54–42	Malta	National Indoor Arena, Birmingham

20 July	Papua New Guinea	75–36	Cayman Islands	National Indoor Arena, Birmingham

20 July	Hong Kong	47–51	Singapore	National Indoor Arena, Birmingham

21 July	Cayman Islands	42–41	Hong Kong	National Indoor Arena, Birmingham

21 July	Papua New Guinea	60–54	Wales	National Indoor Arena, Birmingham

22 July	Wales	74–26	Malaysia	National Indoor Arena, Birmingham

22 July	Papua New Guinea	59–41	Hong Kong	National Indoor Arena, Birmingham

23 July	Malaysia	56–54	Singapore	National Indoor Arena, Birmingham

23 July	Papua New Guinea	71–46	Malta	National Indoor Arena, Birmingham

24 July	Singapore	28–65	Wales	National Indoor Arena, Birmingham

24 July	Papua New Guinea	61–34	Malaysia	National Indoor Arena, Birmingham

24 July	Hong Kong	61–28	Malta	National Indoor Arena, Birmingham

25 July	Papua New Guinea	66–42	Singapore	National Indoor Arena, Birmingham

25 July	Cayman Islands	63–53	Malta	National Indoor Arena, Birmingham

26 July	Cayman Islands	42–63	Wales	National Indoor Arena, Birmingham

26 July	Hong Kong	50–40	Malaysia	National Indoor Arena, Birmingham

26 July	Singapore	86–40	Malta	National Indoor Arena, Birmingham

27 July	Wales	48–39	Hong Kong	National Indoor Arena, Birmingham

27 July	Cayman Islands	51–49	Malaysia	National Indoor Arena, Birmingham

July	Wales	bt	Malta	National Indoor Arena, Birmingham

July	Singapore	bt	Cayman Islands	National Indoor Arena, Birmingham

== Second round ==
=== Group Y ===
Pos	Team	Pld	W	D	L	GF	GA	GD	Pts
1	South Africa	6	6	0	0	432	291	+141	12
2	England	6	5	0	1	420	269	+111	10
3	Trinidad and Tobago	6	4	0	2	365	266	+99	8
4	Malawi	6	3	0	3	336	352	–16	4
5	Saint Vincent and the Grenadines	6	2	0	4	364	404	–40	4
6	Antigua and Barbuda	6	1	0	5	286	438	–152	2
7	United States	6	0	0	6	236	408	–172	0

20 July	Saint Vincent and the Grenadines	60–69	South Africa	National Indoor Arena, Birmingham

20 July	United States	25–63	Trinidad and Tobago	National Indoor Arena, Birmingham

21 July	Saint Vincent and the Grenadines	74–54	Antigua and Barbuda	National Indoor Arena, Birmingham

21 July	England	85–23	United States	National Indoor Arena, Birmingham; Attendance: 6,000

21 July	South Africa	77–53	Malawi	National Indoor Arena, Birmingham

22 July	Trinidad and Tobago	84–36	Antigua and Barbuda	National Indoor Arena, Birmingham

22 July	Malawi	65–58	Saint Vincent and the Grenadines	National Indoor Arena, Birmingham

22 July	South Africa	77–54	England	National Indoor Arena, Birmingham

23 July	Saint Vincent and the Grenadines	51–82	England	National Indoor Arena, Birmingham

23 July	South Africa	76–30	United States	National Indoor Arena, Birmingham

24 July	Malawi	42–59	Trinidad and Tobago	National Indoor Arena, Birmingham

24 July	England	71–38	Antigua and Barbuda	National Indoor Arena, Birmingham

24 July	Saint Vincent and the Grenadines	71–59	United States	National Indoor Arena, Birmingham

25 July	Trinidad and Tobago	49–58	South Africa	National Indoor Arena, Birmingham

25 July	Malawi	45–68	England	National Indoor Arena, Birmingham

25 July	United States	59–63	Antigua and Barbuda	National Indoor Arena, Birmingham

26 July	England	60–35	Trinidad and Tobago	National Indoor Arena, Birmingham
26 July	Scoring by half: 30–19, 30–16			National Indoor Arena, Birmingham

26 July	Malawi	60–50	United States	National Indoor Arena, Birmingham

26 July	South Africa	75–45	Antigua and Barbuda	National Indoor Arena, Birmingham

27 July	Malawi	71–50	Antigua and Barbuda	National Indoor Arena, Birmingham

27 July	Trinidad and Tobago	75–46	Saint Vincent and the Grenadines	National Indoor Arena, Birmingham

=== Group Z ===
Pos	Team	Pld	W	D	L	GF	GA	GD	Pts
1	Australia	6	6	0	0	410	232	+178	12
2	New Zealand	6	5	0	1	410	258	+152	10
3	Jamaica	6	4	0	2	413	317	+96	8
4	Cook Islands	6	3	0	3	368	405	–37	6
5	Samoa	6	2	0	4	289	389	–100	4
6	Barbados	6	1	0	5	269	373	–104	2
7	Canada	6	0	0	6	251	438	–187	0

20 July	Jamaica	71–46	Barbados	National Indoor Arena, Birmingham

20 July	Australia	45–44	New Zealand	National Indoor Arena, Birmingham
20 July	Scoring by quarter: 15–15, 9–8, 10–8, 11–13			National Indoor Arena, Birmingham
20 July	Cusack 19/23 (83%); Borlase 13/15 (87%); Shortland 10/13 (77%)		Taurua 27/33 (82%); Shortland 10/13 (77%); Jerram 7/8 (88%)	National Indoor Arena, Birmingham

20 July	Cook Islands	83–61	Canada	National Indoor Arena, Birmingham

21 July	Australia	75–32	Samoa	National Indoor Arena, Birmingham
21 July	Scoring by quarter: 16–11, 18–5, 21–8, 20–8			National Indoor Arena, Birmingham

21 July	Barbados	43–58	Cook Islands	National Indoor Arena, Birmingham

21 July	New Zealand	70–52	Jamaica	National Indoor Arena, Birmingham

22 July	Samoa	60–47	Canada	National Indoor Arena, Birmingham

22 July	Australia	60–51	Jamaica	National Indoor Arena, Birmingham
22 July	Scoring by quarter: 17–12, 14–9, 17–12, 12–18			National Indoor Arena, Birmingham

23 July	New Zealand	77–44	Barbados	National Indoor Arena, Birmingham

24 July	Jamaica	84–39	Canada	National Indoor Arena, Birmingham

24 July	Australia	79–45	Cook Islands	National Indoor Arena, Birmingham
24 July	Scoring by quarter: 21–16, 18–9, 18–10, 22–10			National Indoor Arena, Birmingham

24 July	Samoa	58–52	Barbados	National Indoor Arena, Birmingham

25 July	Australia	69–33	Barbados	National Indoor Arena, Birmingham
25 July	Scoring by half: 36–13, 33–20			National Indoor Arena, Birmingham

25 July	Cook Islands	74–67	Samoa	National Indoor Arena, Birmingham

25 July	New Zealand	78–37	Canada	National Indoor Arena, Birmingham

26 July	Australia	82–27	Canada	National Indoor Arena, Birmingham
26 July	Scoring by half: 43–17, 49–10			National Indoor Arena, Birmingham

26 July	Jamaica	74–61	Cook Islands	National Indoor Arena, Birmingham

26 July	New Zealand	76–45	Samoa	National Indoor Arena, Birmingham

27 July	New Zealand	81–49	Cook Islands	National Indoor Arena, Birmingham

27 July	Barbados	51–40	Canada	National Indoor Arena, Birmingham

27 July	Jamaica	81–41	Samoa	National Indoor Arena, Birmingham

== Placement matches ==
28 July	Republic of Ireland	48–39	Malaysia	National Indoor Arena, Birmingham

July	Hong Kong	52–42	Bermuda	National Indoor Arena, Birmingham

28 July	Cayman Islands	48–47	Scotland	National Indoor Arena, Birmingham

July	Sri Lanka	63–53	Singapore	National Indoor Arena, Birmingham

28 July	Wales	59–50	Northern Ireland	National Indoor Arena, Birmingham

July	Papua New Guinea	69–45	Namibia	National Indoor Arena, Birmingham

July	Canada	62–42	United States	National Indoor Arena, Birmingham

July	Barbados	62–42	Antigua and Barbuda	National Indoor Arena, Birmingham

July	Samoa	63–58	Saint Vincent and the Grenadines	National Indoor Arena, Birmingham

July	Cook Islands	85–60	Malawi	National Indoor Arena, Birmingham

July	Jamaica	63–40	Trinidad and Tobago	National Indoor Arena, Birmingham

28 July	New Zealand	60–31	England	National Indoor Arena, Birmingham

== Final ==
29 July	Australia	68–48	South Africa	National Indoor Arena, Birmingham
29 July	Scoring by quarter: 17–9, 14–14, 20–12, 17–13			National Indoor Arena, Birmingham
29 July	Borlase 37/41 (90%); Cusack 31/36 (86%)		van Dyk 42/46 (91%); Keevey 5/7 (71%); Hugo 1/1 (100%)	National Indoor Arena, Birmingham

== Final placings ==
Place	Nation
Gold	Australia
Silver	South Africa
Bronze	New Zealand
4	England
5	Jamaica
6	Trinidad and Tobago
7	Cook Islands
8	Malawi
9	Western Samoa
10	Saint Vincent and the Grenadines
11	Barbados
12	Antigua and Barbuda
13	Canada
14	United States
15	Papua New Guinea
16	Namibia
17	Wales
18	Northern Ireland
19	Sri Lanka
20	Singapore
21	Cayman Islands
22	Scotland
23	Hong Kong
24	Bermuda
25	Republic of Ireland
26	Malaysia
27	Malta

== Medallists ==
Gold	Silver	Bronze
Australia; Coach: Jill McIntosh	South Africa; Coach: Marlene Wagner	New Zealand; Coach: Leigh Gibbs
Jenny Borlase; Shelley O'Donnell; Carissa Dalwood; Kath Harby; Natalie Avellino; Liz Ellis; Vicki Wilson; Sarah Sutter; Nicole Cusack; Marianne Murphy; Michelle Fielke (c); Simone McKinnis	Debbie Hamman (c); Irene van Dyk; Benita van Zyl; Elize Kotze; Rese Hugo; Dominique Harverson; Annie Kloppers; Tessa Halgryn; Estelle Rossouw; Laurie Keevy; Rene Odendaal; Johrina Basson	Belinda Blair; Julie Dawson; Sandra Edge (c); Sharon Gold; Carron Jerram; Debbie Matoe; Bernice Mene; Lesley Nicol; Anna Rowberry; Tracy Eyrl-Shortland; Elisa Taringa; Noeline Taurua-Barnett
