= Rita Fatialofa-Paloto =

New Zealand netball and softball player

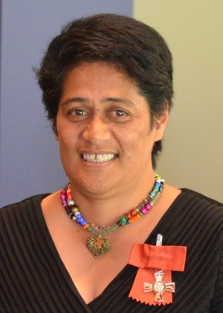
- Fatialofa-Patolo in 2014

Personal information

Netball career
- Playing positions: WA, GA
Years	National team	Caps
1982–1989	New Zealand	45
1991–1995	Western Samoa	
Coaching career
- Years: Team
- 1991–1995: Western Samoa
Medal record
Representing New Zealand
Netball
World Netball Tournament
Silver medal – second place	1983 Singapore	Team
Gold medal – first place	1987 Glasgow	Team
World Games
Gold medal – first place	1989 Karlsruhe	Team
Softball
Women's Softball World Championship
Gold medal – first place	1982 Taipei	Team

Rita Taimalietane Fatialofa-Patolo MNZM (née Fatialofa, born 1963) is a Samoan sportsperson who played netball and softball for New Zealand.

== Biography ==
Fatialofa-Patolo attended Lynfield College in Auckland.

She played for the New Zealand national netball team, the Silver Ferns, from 1982 to 1989. While able to play the shooting circle, her specialised position was wing-attack. She retired after the 1989 World Games where New Zealand defeated Australia in the final. Fatialofa-Patolo served as player coach of the Western Samoa teams at the 1991 and 1995 World Netball Championships. and was also included in Netball New Zealand's all-time Dream Team. In softball, she was a member of the team that won the 1982 Women's Softball World Championship, defeating the host nation in the final.

In the 2014 New Year Honours, Fatialofa-Patolo was appointed a Member of the New Zealand Order of Merit for services to sport.
