= Victoria Wilson =

Victoria Wilson, Vicki Wilson or Vicky Wilson may refer to:

- Victoria Wilson (publisher and writer) (born 1949), US publishing executive
- Victoria Wilson-James, US-born English singer-songwriter
- Vicki Wilson (equestrian), New Zealand equestrian
- Vicki Wilson (netball) (born 1965), Australian netball player and coach
- Vicki Wilson (politician), US politician
- Vicky Riback-Wilson (born 1946), US politician

== See also ==
- Vic Wilson (disambiguation)
