= Tanya Dearns =

New Zealand netball player

Personal information
- Full name: Tanya Jane Dearns (Née: Cox)
- Born: 18 February 1967 (age 59) Rotorua, New Zealand
- Height: 1.87 m (6 ft 2 in)
- Spouse: Grant Dearns (m. 2000)
- Relative: Warner Dearns (son)
- School: Waitakere College; Otumoetai College

Netball career
- Playing positions: GK, GD
Years	National team	Caps
1990–98	New Zealand	41
Coaching career
- Years: Team
- 2000: Capital Shakers (assistant)
- 2001–02: Capital Shakers
- 2006: Western Flyers
- 2013: Waikato BOP Magic (assistant)
- 2016: Central Pulse
- 2018: UWS Sirens
Medal record
Representing New Zealand
Netball World Cup
Silver medal – second place	1991 Sydney	Tournament
World Games
Silver medal – second place	1993 The Hague	Tournament

Tanya Jane Dearns (née Cox; born 18 February 1967) is a New Zealand netball coach and former netball player. She played 41 international matches for the New Zealand team between 1990 and 1998, including at the 1991 World Netball Championships.

== Early life ==
Dearns was born Tanya Jane Cox in Rotorua on 18 February 1967, the daughter of John and Janette Cox. Her father worked for the Post Office and the family lived in various towns in the North Island, including Hastings, Auckland, and Tauranga. Cox was educated at Waitakere College in West Auckland, and Otumoetai College in Tauranga, representing the latter school in both netball and basketball.

== Netball career ==
Cox began playing representative netball for Western Bay of Plenty, before moving to Wellington where she played for the Pacific Island Church club and represented Wellington for 16 years. In 1987, she was in the New Zealand under-21 side, before playing basketball professionally in Australia for the Nunawading Spectres in 1987 and 1988.

Cox returned to netball and was a member of the Silver Ferns from 1990 to 1998, with a break in 1994 and 1995 when she coached the Wellington team. Cox was a member of the New Zealand team at the 1991 World Netball Championships, where the Silver Ferns finished as runners-up. She also completed with the national side at the 1993 World Games, once again coming second behind Australia. Across her international career, Cox played in 31 Test matches.

Between 1998 and 2000, Cox played for the Capital Shakers in the National Bank Cup, and was assistant coach of the side in 2000, with Lois Muir as head coach. Cox retired as a player at the end of the 2000 season, and married rugby coach Grant Dearns on 16 September 2000. The couple went on to have two children, including rugby union player Warner Dearns.

Tanya Dearns was head coach of the Capital Shakers in 2001 and 2002, before moving to Napier in 2003 to become Netball Eastern regional manager. Dearns returned to coaching for a year in 2006, leading the Western Flyers in the National Bank Cup. She then took up a position as general manager of the Napier Golf Club, before being appointed assistant coach of the Waikato Bay of Plenty Magic for the 2013 ANZ Championship season. Despite being publicly endorsed by outgoing coach Noeline Taurua at the end of the 2013 season, Dearns was overlooked for the Magic's head coach role in favour of Australian Julie Fitzgerald, and instead was appointed as general manager of the Hawke's Bay Hawks franchise in the National Basketball League. Dearns succeeded Robyn Broughton as coach of the Central Pulse for the 2016 ANZ Championship season. However, the Pulse won just two of their 13 matches in 2016, and Dearns was replaced as coach by Yvette McCausland-Durie. Dearns was subsequently head coach of the UWS Sirens in Scotland, before moving to the Cairns Netball Association in Queensland as operations manager at the end of 2018.
