= 1991 World Netball Championships =

International netball tournament hosted by Australia

Tournament details
- Host country: Australia
- City: Sydney
- Venue(s): State Sports Centre; Sydney Entertainment Centre
- Dates: 1–13 July 1991
- Teams: 20
- TV partner(s): Network 10 (Australia); Television New Zealand

Final positions
- Champions: Australia (6th title)
- Runners-up: New Zealand
- Third place: Jamaica

Tournament statistics
- Matches played: 110

The 1991 World Netball Championships was the eighth Netball World Cup. It featured 20 teams playing a series of netball test matches in Sydney in July 1991. It was hosted at two venues, the State Sports Centre and Sydney Entertainment Centre. The tournament saw a number of firsts. It was the first tournament referred to as a World Netball Championship. It was the first tournament held indoors. It was also the first tournament that featured semi-finals and an outright final. It also marked the first time in Australian history that it had been televised live. The tournament was sponsored by Johnson & Johnson. With a team coached by Joyce Brown and captained by Michelle Fielke, Australia won the tournament. In the final, they defeated reigning champions New Zealand 53–52 to claim their sixth title. The final is regarded as one of the all time epic encounters between Australia and New Zealand and was hailed as one of the greatest netball games ever. Bob Hawke, the Prime Minister of Australia, and a lifelong sports enthusiast, called it the best sporting contest he had ever seen. In 1992, Joyce Brown and the Australia team were all awarded the Medal of the Order of Australia. In 2012 they were inducted into the Sport Australia Hall of Fame. In Australia, the final was broadcast live on Network 10. In New Zealand, matches were broadcast live on Television New Zealand.

== Teams, head coaches and captains ==
Team	Head coach	Captain
Australia	Joyce Brown	Michelle Fielke
Canada	Ann Willcocks	
Cayman Islands	Jean Pierre	Lyneth Monteith
Cook Islands	Margharet Matenga; Mavi Teparekura	Selina Matenga
England	Betty Galsworthy	Kendra Lowe
Fiji	Elizabeth Freeman	Viki Tuxson
Hong Kong	Val Eaton	Anne Tinlin
Republic of Ireland	Rosemary Mayes	Kathleen Dunleavy
Jamaica	Maureen Hall	Janet Johnson
Malaysia	Rogayah Ahmad	Carmen Edmonds
Namibia	Nico Smit	Elizabeth Smit
New Zealand	Lyn Parker	Waimarama Taumaunu
Northern Ireland	Mary Hicks	Elizabeth Rodgers
Papua New Guinea	Emily Taule	Lydia Veali
Scotland	Anne Clark	Alexandra Frame
Singapore	Bette Allison Bem	Vicki Woo
Sri Lanka	Trixie Nanayakara	Pryantha Peiries
Western Samoa	Rita Fatialofa	Rita Fatialofa
Vanuatu	Heather Lini	Jeanette Bolenga
Wales	Julia Longille	Maria Gornell

- The Cayman Islands, Namibia, Vanuatu and Western Samoa all made their Netball World Cup debuts.
- Trinidad and Tobago missed the 1991 tournament after they were suspended by the International Federation of Netball Associations after their late withdrawal from the 1989 World Games. As a result, they missed the 1990 Caribbean Netball Championship which served as a qualifier the 1991 tournament.

== Milestones ==
- Jamaica's Janet Johnson and Northern Ireland's Elizabeth Rodgers played in their 5th and final Netball World Cup tournament, equalling the record at the time for most individual appearances set by Trinidad and Tobago's Jean Pierre. Meanwhile, Pierre, coaching the Cayman Islands, featured at her eighth World Cup.
- On 9 July 1991, the Cook Islands beat Vanuatu 120–38, making it the highest score a single team has scored in the tournaments history.
- Joyce Brown won her third title as a head coach. She previously coached Australia when they won in 1975 and 1983.

== Match officials ==
Umpires included

Umpire	Association
Maureen Boyle	Australia
Sheelagh Redpath	England
Avril Roper	Wales
Mamia Tunui Savage	Cook Islands

== Group A ==
=== Matches ===
Day 1

Monday, 1 July	Jamaica	66–47	Northern Ireland
	Charmaine Aldridge 48; Connie Francis 18		Nuala Mullan 29; Joanne Skehin 18

Monday, 1 July	Canada	80–19	Vanuatu
	Nicola Steiner 34; Marina Leigertwood 29; Tania Braslis 17		Roby Saul 18; Kaylirie Tavoa 1

Monday, 1 July	Cook Islands	67–26	Hong Kong
	Tutai Pakitoa 38; Margharet Matenga 29		Christine Cornish 18; Simone McLennan 8

Monday, 1 July	Republic of Ireland	53–45	Namibia
	Louise Wall 29; Sandra Turner 24		Esmie Van Rooi 29; Joan Smit 16

Monday, 1 July	New Zealand	91–29	Papua New Guinea	Sydney Entertainment Centre
21:00	Leonie Leaver 50; Tracy Eyrl-Shortland 41

Day 2

Tuesday, 2 July	Canada	71–32	Hong Kong	State Sports Centre
	Marina Leigertwood 48; Nicola Steiner 23		Simone McLennan 18; Christine Cornish 14

Tuesday, 2 July	New Zealand	96–27	Vanuatu	State Sports Centre
	Carron Topping 58; Julie Carter 38		Roby Saul 18; Selina Tabe 9

Tuesday, 2 July	Cook Islands	61–50	Namibia	State Sports Centre
	Margharet Matenga 37; Tutai Pakitoa 24		Esmie Van Rooi 46; Joan Smit 3 Sharon Holland 1

Tuesday, 2 July	Northern Ireland	49–47	Papua New Guinea	State Sports Centre
	Nuala Mullan 34; Joanne Skehin 15		Violet David 29; Kila Aukopi 18

Day 3

Wednesday, 3 July	Republic of Ireland	59–37	Hong Kong
13:30	Helen Kelly 30; Sandra Turner 29		Simone McLennan 25; Christine Cornish 12

Wednesday, 3 July	Jamaica	78–62	Cook Islands
15:15	Patricia McDonald 54; Connie Francis 20		Tutai Pakitoa 53; Margharet Matenga 9

Wednesday, 3 July	New Zealand	93–21	Northern Ireland
17:00	Leonie Leaver 55; Julie Carter 28; Tracy Eyrl-Shortland 10		Edel Kelly 17; Helen Burke 4

Wednesday, 3 July	Namibia	95–22	Vanuatu
19:00	Esmie Van Rooi 76; Sharon Holland 16; Joan Smit 3		Roby Saul 13; Kayleen Tavoa 9

Day 4

Thursday, 4 July	Canada	70–44	Northern Ireland
13:30	Marina Leigertwood 44/50 (88%); Nicola Steiner 26		Nuala Mullan 24; Edel Kelly 12; Joanne Skehin 8

Thursday, 4 July	New Zealand	78–44	Namibia
15:15	Tracy Eyrl-Shortland 39; Julie Carter 39		Esmie Van Rooi 41; Joan Smit 3

Thursday, 4 July	Cook Islands	67–44	Republic of Ireland
17:15	Tutai Pakitoa 43; Margharet Matenga 24		Sandra Turner 18; Louise Wall 15; Helen Kelly 11

Thursday, 4 July	Jamaica	65–37	Papua New Guinea
18:45	Patricia McDonald 55; Janet Johnson 10		Violet David 19; Ianna Karona 12; Kila Aukopi 6

Day 5

Friday, 5 July	Republic of Ireland	53–38	Northern Ireland
	Helen Kelly 40; Sandra Turner 13		Nuala Mullan 27; Joanne Skehin 9 Edel Kelly 2

Friday, 5 July	Jamaica	114–23	Vanuatu
	Patricia McDonald 81/97 (84%); Connie Francis 33/34 (97%)		Roby Saul 17; Kayleen Tavoa 5 Selina Tabe 1

Friday, 5 July	Cook Islands	84–59	Papua New Guinea
	Tutai Pakitoa 44; Margharet Matenga 40		Violet David 45; Kila Aukopi 8 Josephine Walsa 6

Friday, 5 July	Namibia	64–34	Hong Kong
	Esmie Van Rooi 56; Joan Smit 5 Sharon Holland 3		Christine Cornish 16; Simone McLennan 15; Kim Clarke 3

Day 6

Saturday, 6 July	New Zealand	68–63	Jamaica
	Tracy Eyrl-Shortland 47; Julie Carter 21		Patricia McDonald 55; Connie Francis 8

Saturday, 6 July	Cook Islands	75–45	Northern Ireland
	Margharet Matenga 40; Tutai Pakitoa 35		Edel Kelly 30; Helen Burke 15

Saturday, 6 July	Canada	50–39	Republic of Ireland
	Marina Leigertwood 27; Nicola Steiner 23		Sandra Turner 24; Helen Kelly 15

Saturday, 6 July	Papua New Guinea	66–66	Namibia
	Violet David 46; Kila Aukopi 20		Esmie Van Rooi 64; Joan Smit 2

Day 7

Sunday, 7 July	Papua New Guinea	58–37	Hong Kong
	Violet David 46; Kila Aukopi 12		Christine Cornish 19; Simone McLennan 18

Sunday, 7 July	Northern Ireland	68–31	Vanuatu
	Nuala Mullen 32; Edel Kelly 18; Helen Burke 18		Roby Saul 16; Selina Tabe 15

Sunday, 7 July	New Zealand	86–24	Canada
	Leonie Leaver 57; Tracy Eyrl-Shortland 16; Julie Carter 13		Marina Leigertwood 14; Nicola Steiner 10

Sunday, 7 July	Jamaica	73–31	Republic of Ireland
	Patricia McDonald 38; Connie Francis 27; Charmaine Aldridge 8		Sandra Turner 15; Helen Kelly 10; Louise Wall 6

Day 8

Monday, 8 July	Republic of Ireland	70–37	Vanuatu
	Helen Kelly 45; Sandra Turner 25		Roby Saul 36; Selina Tabe 1

Monday, 8 July	Northern Ireland	61–61	Namibia
	Nuala Mullen 36; Helen Burke 25		Esmie Van Rool 49; Joan Smit 12

Monday, 8 July	New Zealand	104–14	Hong Kong
	Tracy Eyrl-Shortland 38; Carron Topping 33; Leonie Leaver 23; Julie Carter 10		Christine Cornish 10; Kim Clarke 4

Monday, 8 July	Cook Islands	77–51	Canada
	Tutai Pakitoa 56; Margharet Matenga 12; Angela Mauate 9		Marina Leigertwood 33; Nicola Steiner 18

Day 9

Tuesday, 9 July	Cook Islands	120–38	Vanuatu
	Angela Mauate 102; Tutai Pakitoa 18		Roby Saul 37; Susan Natuka 1

Tuesday, 9 July	Canada	61–47	Namibia
	Marina Leigertwood 39; Nicola Steiner 22		Esmie Van Rool 43; Joan Smit 4

Tuesday, 9 July	Jamaica	87–28	Hong Kong
	Patricia McDonald 40; Connie Francis 26; Charmaine Aldridge 16; Janet Johnson 5		Catherine Reed 21; Simone McLennan 7

Tuesday, 9 July	Republic of Ireland	52–48	Papua New Guinea
	Helen Kelly 36; Sandra Turner 16		Violet David 30; Iano Karona 13; Kila Aukopi 5

Day 10

Wednesday, 10 July	New Zealand	86–26	Republic of Ireland
	Julie Carter 36; Leonie Leaver 27; Carron Topping 23		Sandra Turner 14; Louise Wall 12

Wednesday, 10 July	Jamaica	67–39	Canada
	Patricia McDonald 48; Connie Francis 19		Marina Leigertwood 22; Nicola Steiner 17

Wednesday, 10 July	Papua New Guinea	82–44	Vanuatu
	Kila Aukooi 41; Iana Korana 41		Roby Saul 36; Selina Tabe 4 Merilyn Kaitabang 4

Wednesday, 10 July	Northern Ireland	57–33	Hong Kong
	Nuala Mullen 41; Joanne Skehin 11; Helen Burke 5		Christine Cornish 20; Simone McLennan 12; Catherine Reed 1

Day 11

Thursday, 11 July	New Zealand	94–40	Cook Islands
	Leonie Leaver 46; Tracy Eyrl-Shortland 33; Julie Carter 15		Tutai Pakitoa 32; Margharet Matenga 8

Thursday, 11 July	Hong Kong	68–38	Vanuatu
	Christine Cornish 38; Simone McLennan 30		Roby Saul 31; Kayline Tavoa 7

Thursday, 11 July	Jamaica	74–56	Namibia
	Patricia McDonald 51; Connie Francis 21; Janet Johnson 2		Esmie Van Rool 52; Joan Smit 4

Thursday, 11 July	Canada	62–56	Papua New Guinea
	Marina Leigertwood 40; Nicola Steiner 22		Violet David 39; Kila Aukopi 17

=== Final table ===
Pos	Team	Pld	W	D	L	GF	GA	GD	Pts
1	New Zealand	9	9	0	0	796	288	+508	18
2	Jamaica	9	8	0	1	687	391	+296	16
3	Cook Islands	9	7	0	2	653	485	+168	14
4	Canada	9	6	0	3	508	467	+41	12
5	Republic of Ireland	9	5	0	4	427	481	–54	10
6	Northern Ireland	9	3	1	5	430	529	–99	7
7	Namibia	9	2	2	5	528	510	+18	6
8	Papua New Guinea	9	2	1	6	488	530	–42	5
9	Hong Kong	9	1	0	8	309	605	–296	2
10	Vanuatu	9	0	0	9	259	799	–540	0

Qualified for 1st–4th Classification
Qualified for 5th–8th Classification
Qualified for 9th–12th Classification
Qualified for 13th–16th Classification
Qualified for 17th–20th Classification

== Group B ==
=== Matches ===
Day 1

Monday, 1 July	Australia	84–19	Fiji	Sydney Entertainment Centre
18:30	Vicki Wilson 52/65 (80%); Jennifer Kennett 21/23 (91%); Catriona Wagg 11/15 (73%)		Lisi Ravaga 8 Vasiti Vugakoto 7 Timaima Vugakolo 4	Attendance: 5,000+

Monday, 1 July	Western Samoa	69–39	Sri Lanka
	Mesepi Kasiano 39; Amanda Dunlop 30		Pryantha Peiries 20; Jayanthi Somekeram 19

Monday, 1 July	England	48–22	Scotland
	Joan Bryan 30; Sharon Fogarty 18		Sandra Robertson 12; Elizabeth Balfour 6 Mary Ann Cosgrove 4

Monday, 1 July	Wales	82–23	Malaysia
	Rhian Jones 77; Elizabeth Rees 5		Sien Ying Tong 18; Fatimah Salleh 5

Day 2

Tuesday, 2 July	England	92–7	Singapore	State Sports Centre
	Trudy Papafio 70; Yvette Foster 22		Seah Ching Ching 4 Yeo Mee Hong 3

Tuesday, 2 July	Australia	95–24	Cayman Islands	State Sports Centre
	Catriona Wagg 35/46 (76%); Jennifer Kennett 34/37 (92%); Vicki Wilson 26/29 (90%)	Report	Laverne Davis 14; Claudette Myies 9 Cassandra Powell 1

Tuesday, 2 July	Fiji	64–31	Malaysia	State Sports Centre
	Vasiti Vugakoto 33; Timaima Vugakolo 31		Tracy Tong 16; Fatimah Salleh 15

Tuesday, 2 July	Scotland	58–33	Sri Lanka	State Sports Centre
	Jackie Lydon 47; Liz Balfour 6 Mary Ann Cosgrove 5		Pryantha Peiries 24; Jayanthi Somekeram 9

Day 3

Wednesday, 3 July	Western Samoa	53–52	Wales
13:45	Amanda Dunlop 36; Mesepi Kasiano 9 Rita Fatialofa 8		Pamela Walker 36; Rhian Jones 10; Kim Lemon 6

Wednesday, 3 July	Malaysia	53–47	Cayman Islands
15:30	Tracy Tong 40; Fatimah Salleh 13	Report	Laverne Davis 34; Claudette Myies 13

Wednesday, 3 July	Australia	76–22	Scotland
18:45	Jennifer Kennett 37/45 (82%); Catriona Wagg 21; Vicki Wilson 12; Sue Kenny 6		Sandra Robertson 15; Elizabeth Balfour 7

Day 4

Thursday, 4 July	Wales	51–47	Fiji
13:45	Pamela Walker 38; Kim Lemon 13		Timaima Vugakolo 36; Vasiti Vugakoto 11

Thursday, 4 July	Western Samoa	60–32	Singapore
15:30	Shariene Schwalger 31; Rosemarie Eseva 15; Molly Young 14		Noraida Abdul Mlik 17; Jean Ching Ching 15

Thursday, 4 July	England	68–20	Sri Lanka
17:00	Joan Bryan 57; Sharon Fogarty 11		Pryantha Peiries 14; Jayanthi Somekeram 4 Shervonne Ramlan 2

Thursday, 4 July	Scotland	55–29	Cayman Islands
19:00	Sandra Robertson 35; Elizabeth Balfour 13; Mary Ann Cosgrove 7	Report	Claudette Myies 16; Cassandra Powell 10; Laverne Davis 3

Day 5

Friday, 5 July	Wales	43–38	Scotland
	Pamela Walker 26; Sian Jones 15; Kim Lemon 2		Sandra Robertson 20; Elizabeth Balfour 18

Friday, 5 July	Australia	113–12	Singapore
	Catriona Wagg 52; Vicki Wilson 31; Jennifer Kennett 30		Noraida Abdul Mlik 9 Yeo Mee Hong 3

Friday, 5 July	Fiji	58–39	Sri Lanka
	Timaima Vugakolo 33; Lisi Ravaga 16; Kinismere Naisara 9		Pryantha Peiries 23; Jayanthi Somekeram 16

Friday, 5 July	England	84–16	Cayman Islands
	Joan Bryan 57; Sharon Fogarty 27	Report	Claudette Myies 10; Cassandra Powell 4 Laverne Davis 2

Friday, 5 July	Western Samoa	68–31	Malaysia
	Mesepi Faamsino 37; Amanda Dunlop 31		Mimi Shamsudin 14; Tracy Tong 11; Fatimah Safeh 6

Day 6

Saturday, 6 July	Cayman Islands	49–48	Sri Lanka
	Laverne Davis 20; Cassandra Powell 15; Claudette Myies 14	Report	Pryantha Peiries 35; Jayanthi Somekeram 13

Saturday, 6 July	England	70–26	Fiji
	Trudy Panalio 52; Yvette Foster 18		Timaima Vugakolo 17; Vasiti Vugaokto 6 Lisi Ravaga 3

Saturday, 6 July	Australia	77–31	Wales
	Vicki Wilson 40/46 (87%); Catriona Wagg 22; Jennifer Kennett 15/18 (83%)		Pamela Walker 26; Sian Jones 3 Kim Lemon 2

Saturday, 6 July	Singapore	49–39	Malaysia
	Seah Ching Ching 34; Noraida Abdul Mlik 15		Fatimah Safeh 20; Tracy Tong 18; Mimi Shamsudin 1

Saturday, 6 July	Western Samoa	47–46	Scotland
	Amanda Dunlop 36; Rita Fatialofa 6 Mesepi Faamsino 5		Sandra Robertson 38; Mary Ann Cosgrove 7 Elizabeth Balfour 1

Day 7

Sunday, 7 July	Australia	65–38	England	State Sports Centre
	Vicki Wilson 40/47 (85%); Catriona Wagg 17; Jennifer Kennett 8		Joan Bryan 30/37 (81%); Yvette Foster 6 Sharon Fogarty 2

Sunday, 7 July	Sri Lanka	53–31	Malaysia
	Pryantha Peiries 38; Jayanthi Somekeram 15		Tracy Tong 17; Fatimah Safeh 14

Sunday, 7 July	Cayman Islands	57–50	Singapore
	Laverne Davis 41; Claudette Myies 16		Seah Ching Ching 34; Noraida Abdul Mlik 16

Day 8

Monday, 8 July	Wales	66–40	Sri Lanka
	Rhian Jones 31; Pamela Walker 18; Sian Jones 11; Kim Lemon 6		Pryantha Peiries 24; Jayanthi Somekeram 12; A.K. Anusha 4

Monday, 8 July	Scotland	66–28	Singapore
	Jacqui Lydon 47; Sandra Robertson 19		Seah Ching Ching 13; Yap Hui Kim 12; Noraida Abdul Mlik 3

Monday, 8 July	Fiji	69–33	Cayman Islands
	Timaima Vugakolo 38; Vasiti Vugaokto 31		Laverne Davis 20; Claudette Myies 13

Monday, 8 July	England	65–30	Western Samoa
	Trudy Panalio 46; Yvette Foster 19		Amanda Dunlop 22; Mesepi Faamsino 7 Rita Fatialofa 1

Day 9

Tuesday, 9 July	Australia	81–25	Western Samoa	State Sports Centre
13:30	Vicki Wilson 53; Jennifer Kennett 28		Amanda Dunlop 17; Rita Fatialofa 8

Tuesday, 9 July	Fiji	57–42	Singapore	State Sports Centre
	Timaima Vugakolo 44; Lisi Ravaga 11; Kinisimare Naisara 2		Seah Ching Ching 22; Yeo Mee Hong 20

Tuesday, 9 July	Wales	85–18	Cayman Islands	State Sports Centre
	Pamela Walker 65; Kim Lemon 14; Sian Jones 6		Laverne Davis 9 Claudette Myies 6 Cassandra Powell 3

Tuesday, 9 July	Scotland	50–30	Malaysia	State Sports Centre
	Sandra Robertson 30; Elizabeth Balfour 20		Fatimah Safeh 16; Tracy Tong 10; Mimi Shamsudin 4

Day 10

Wednesday, 10 July	Sri Lanka	53–46	Singapore	State Sports Centre
	Pryantha Peiries 39; Jayanthai Somekeram 14		Seah Ching Ching 26; Yeo Mee Hong 15; Noraida Abdul Malik 5

Wednesday, 10 July	Australia	76–27	Malaysia	State Sports Centre
	Vicki Wilson 48; Catriona Wagg 28		Fatimah Safeh 13; Tracy Tong 12; Tap Ai Chu 2

Wednesday, 10 July	Fiji	57–53	Western Samoa	State Sports Centre
	Timaima Vugakolo 43; Vasiti Vugakolo 14		Amanda Dunlop 41; Rita Fatialofa 12

Wednesday, 10 July	England	47–30	Wales	State Sports Centre
	Joan Bryan 25; Trudy Papafio 12; Yvette Foster 9 Sharon Fogarty 1		Rhian Jones 21; Pamela Walker 6 Kim Lemon 3

Day 11

Thursday, 11 July	Western Samoa	75–23	Cayman Islands	State Sports Centre
	Amanda Dunlop 40; Rita Fatialofa 22; Molly Young 13		Claudette Myies 15; Laverne Davis 6 Cassandra Powell 2

Thursday, 11 July	England	77–16	Malaysia	State Sports Centre
	Trudy Panalio 34; Joan Bryan 28; Sharon Fogarty 15		Fatimah Safeh 9 Yap Ai Chu 6 Mimi Shamsudin 1

Thursday, 11 July	Australia	107–10	Sri Lanka	State Sports Centre
	Vicki Wilson 59; Catriona Wagg 29; Jennifer Kennett 19		Pryantha Peiries 8 Jayanthi Somekeram 2

Thursday, 11 July	Scotland	48–31	Fiji	State Sports Centre
	Sandra Robertson 31; Elizabeth Balfour 17		Vasiti Vugaokto 27; Kinisimere Naisara 3 Lisi Ravaga 1

Thursday, 11 July	Wales	69–42	Singapore	State Sports Centre
	Pamela Walker 45; Rhian Jones 21; Kim Lemon 3		Seah Ching Ching 30; Noraida Abdul Mlik 8 Yeo Mee Hong 4

=== Final table ===
Pos	Team	Pld	W	D	L	GF	GA	GD	Pts
1	Australia	9	9	0	0	774	208	+566	18
2	England	9	8	0	1	589	237	+352	16
3	Wales	9	6	0	3	514	385	+129	12
4	Western Samoa	9	6	0	3	480	426	+56	12
5	Scotland	9	5	0	4	405	365	+40	10
6	Fiji	9	5	0	4	428	451	–23	10
7	Sri Lanka	9	2	0	7	335	552	–217	4
8	Cayman Islands	9	2	0	7	296	614	–318	4
9	Singapore	9	1	0	8	308	606	–298	2
10	Malaysia	9	1	0	8	281	566	–285	2

Qualified for 1st–4th Classification
Qualified for 5th–8th Classification
Qualified for 9th–12th Classification
Qualified for 13th–16th Classification
Qualified for 17th–20th Classification

== 17th–20th Classification ==
Playoffs

Friday, 12 July	Hong Kong	49–36	Malaysia	State Sports Centre
9:00

Friday, 12 July	Singapore	66–46	Vanuatu	State Sports Centre
10:45	Seah Ching Ching 37; Noraida Abdul Malik 29		Roby Saul 39; Kayleen Tavoa 4 Selina Tabe 2 Suzane Natuka 1

19th/20th playoff

Saturday, 13 July	Malaysia	66–33	Vanuatu
	Tracy Tong 45; Fatimah Salleh 21		Kayleen Tavoa 12; Selina Tabe 10; Roby Saul 7

17th/18th playoff

Saturday, 13 July	Hong Kong	54–46	Singapore
	Christine Cornish 30; Simone McLennan 24		Seah Ching Ching 33; Yeo Mee Hong 10; Noraida Abdul Mlik 3

== 13th–16th Classification ==
Playoffs

Friday, 12 July	Papua New Guinea	67–40	Sri Lanka	State Sports Centre
9:15

Friday, 12 July	Namibia	72–44	Cayman Islands	State Sports Centre
9:00

15th/16th playoff

Saturday, 13 July	Sri Lanka	57–27	Cayman Islands
	Pryantha Peiries 47; A.K. Anusha 10		Laverne Davis 22; Claudette Myies 4 Cassandra Powell 1

13th/14th playoff

Saturday, 13 July	Namibia	72–53	Papua New Guinea
	Esmie Van Rooi 66; Joan Smit 6		Violet David 29; Kila Aukopi 24

== 9th–12th Classification ==
Playoffs

Friday, 12 July	Scotland	52–38	Northern Ireland	State Sports Centre
10:45	Sandra Robertson 28; Elizabeth Balfour 24		Nuala Mullan 19; Helen Burke 18; Joanne Skehin 1

Friday, 12 July	Republic of Ireland	57–46	Fiji	State Sports Centre
11:00	Helen Kelly 40; Sandra Turner 17		Vasiti Vugakoto 27; Lisi Ravaga 19

11th/12th playoff

Saturday, 13 July	Fiji	64–56	Northern Ireland
	Vasiti Vugakoto 50; Ana Founichew 14		Joanne Skehin 38; Helen Burke 14

9th/10th playoff

Saturday, 13 July	Scotland	51–31	Republic of Ireland
	Jacqui Lydon 32; Elizabeth Balfour 19		Sandra Turner 19; Louise Wall 7 Helen Kelly 5

== 5th–8th Classification ==
Playoffs

Friday, 12 July	Cook Islands	78–65	Western Samoa	Sydney Entertainment Centre
14:15	Tutai Pakitoa 56; Margharet Matenga 17; Angela Madate 5		Amanda Dunlop 50; Rita Fatialofa 15

Friday, 12 July	Canada	57–41	Wales	Sydney Entertainment Centre
16:00	Marina Leigertwood 32; Nicola Steiner 25		Pamela Walker 21; Rhian Jones 14; Kim Lemon 6

7th/8th playoff

Saturday, 13 July	Wales	52–48	Western Samoa
	Pamela Walker 43; Rhian Jones 5 Kim Lemon 4		Amanda Dunlop 38; Veronika Faleala 10; Rita Fatialofa 9

5th/6th playoff

Saturday, 13 July	Cook Islands	77–57	Canada
	Tutai Pakitoa 48; Margharet Matenga 29		Marina Leigertwood 29; Nicola Steiner 28

== 1st–4th Classification ==
The semi-finals, bronze medal match and final were all played at the Sydney Entertainment Centre.

Semifinals
Friday, 12 July
New Zealand	53
England	33
Friday, 12 July
Australia	68
Jamaica	62

Final
Saturday, 13 July
Australia	53
New Zealand	52
Bronze Medal Match
Saturday, 13 July
Jamaica	63
England	54

=== Semi finals ===
Friday, 12 July; 17:45	New Zealand	53–33	England
Friday, 12 July; 17:45	Tracy Eyrl-Shortland 32; Leonie Leaver 13; Julie Carter 8		Joan Bryan 21; Sharon Fotarty 12

Friday, 12 July; 19:30	Australia	68–62	Jamaica	Attendance: 8000
Friday, 12 July; 19:30	Vicki Wilson 51; Catriona Wagg 17		Patricia McDonald 54; Connie Francis 8	Attendance: 8000

=== Bronze medal match ===
Saturday, 13 July	Jamaica	54–63	England
Saturday, 13 July	Patricia McDonald 34; Connie Francis 29		Trady Papalio 49; Sharon Fotarty 5

=== Final ===
In the final, Australia defeated New Zealand 53–52 to claim their sixth title. The final, which was broadcast live on Network 10, is regarded as one of the all time epic encounters between Australia and New Zealand and was hailed as one of the greatest netball games ever. Bob Hawke, the Prime Minister of Australia, and a lifelong sports enthusiast, called it the best sporting contest he had seen. At a packed Sydney Entertainment Centre, New Zealand held a one point lead after each of the first three quarters. Australia's goal attack, Catriona Wagg, scored with less than a minute remaining to put them ahead 53-51, but New Zealand stayed in touch with a goal from Tracy Eyrl-Shortland. New Zealand's captain, Waimarama Taumaunu, gained possession and sent the ball flying towards the goal circle. However, Roselee Jencke, made a match-saving intercept to ensure a one-goal victory for Australia. Jencke passed the ball to a teammate, and the relieved home side threw it around until the umpire’s whistle signalled full-time and a 53-52 victory.

Saturday, 13 July	Australia	53–52	New Zealand	Attendance: 10,500; Umpires: Sheelagh Redpath (England); Mamia Tunui Savage (Cook Islands)
Saturday, 13 July	Scoring by quarter: 13–14, 26–27, 40–41, 53–52			Attendance: 10,500; Umpires: Sheelagh Redpath (England); Mamia Tunui Savage (Cook Islands)
Saturday, 13 July	Tracy Eyrl-Shortland 34/40 (85%); Julie Carter 18/20 (90%)		Vicki Wilson 42/56 (75%); Catriona Wagg 11/13 (85%)	Attendance: 10,500; Umpires: Sheelagh Redpath (England); Mamia Tunui Savage (Cook Islands)

== Final placings ==
Place	Nation
1st place, gold medalist(s)	Australia
2nd place, silver medalist(s)	New Zealand
3rd place, bronze medalist(s)	Jamaica
4	England
5	Cook Islands
6	Canada
7	Wales
8	Western Samoa
9	Scotland
10	Republic of Ireland
11	Fiji
12	Northern Ireland
13	Namibia
14	Papua New Guinea
15	Sri Lanka
16	Cayman Islands
17	Hong Kong
18	Singapore
19	Malaysia
20	Vanuatu

== Medallists ==
Gold	Silver	Bronze
Australia; Coach: Joyce Brown	New Zealand; Coach: Lyn Parker	Jamaica; Coach: Maureen Hall
Carissa Dalwood; Keeley Devery; Michelle Fielke (c); Sharon Finnan; Roselee Jencke; Jennifer Kennett; Sue Kenny; Simone McKinnis; Shelley O'Donnell; Catriona Wagg; Vicki Wilson	Julie Carter; Tanya Cox; Robin Dillimore; Sandra Edge; Tracy Eyrl-Shortland; Joan Hodson; Leonie Leaver; Ana Noovao; Waimarama Taumaunu (c); Carron Topping; Sheryl Waite; Louisa Wall	Charmaine Aldridge; Valerie Blake; Karen Clarke; Connie Francis; Janet Francis; Karlene Hamilton; Janet Johnson (c); Marva Lindsay; Patricia McDonald; Marjorie Patterson; Oberon Pitterson; Sharon Taylor
