= Netball at the 1998 Commonwealth Games =

Commonwealth Games netball tournament hosted by Malaysia

Tournament details
- Host country: Malaysia
- City: Kuala Lumpur
- Venue(s): Juara Stadium, Bukit Kiara Sports Complex
- Dates: 14–21 September 1998
- Teams: 12

Final positions
- Champions: Australia (1st title)
- Runners-up: New Zealand
- Third place: England

Tournament statistics
- Matches played: 34

Netball at the 1998 Commonwealth Games was the inaugural netball tournament at the Commonwealth Games. Twelve teams, including the hosts Malaysia, featured in a series of matches played in September 1998, at Juara Stadium in Kuala Lumpur's Bukit Kiara Sports Complex. With a team captained by Vicki Wilson, featuring Liz Ellis, Kathryn Harby, Simone McKinnis, Sharelle McMahon, Shelley O'Donnell and Carissa Tombs and coached by Jill McIntosh, Australia won the tournament after defeating New Zealand 42–39 in the gold medal match. England finished the tournament in third place after defeating South Africa 56–54 in the bronze medal match. The final and Australia's semi-final against South Africa were broadcast on Nine's Wide World of Sports.

== Group A ==
=== Round 1 ===
14 September 1998	Malaysia	17–85	Australia

14 September 1998	England	51–29	Barbados

14 September 1998	Jamaica	74–36	Canada

=== Round 2 ===
15 September 1998	Australia	85–25	Canada

15 September 1998	England	52–51	Jamaica

15 September 1998	Malaysia	30–58	Barbados

=== Round 3 ===
16 September 1998	Australia	71–36	Barbados

16 September 1998	England	62–32	Canada

16 September 1998	Malaysia	26–83	Jamaica

=== Round 4 ===
17 September 1998	Australia	70–38	Jamaica

17 September 1998	Malaysia	19–63	England

17 September 1998	Barbados	57–44	Canada

=== Round 5 ===
18 September 1998	Australia	66–29	England

18 September 1998	Malaysia	28–58	Canada

18 September 1998	Jamaica	71–39	Barbados

=== Table ===
Pos	Team	P	W	D	L	GF	GA	GD	Pts
1	Australia	5	5	0	0	377	145	+232	10
2	England	5	4	0	1	257	197	+60	8
3	Jamaica	5	3	0	2	317	223	-94	6
4	Barbados	5	2	0	3	219	267	-48	4
5	Canada	5	1	0	4	195	306	-111	2
6	Malaysia	5	0	0	5	120	347	-227	0

Qualified for Semi-final 1
Qualified for Semi-final 2

== Group B ==
=== Round 1 ===
14 September 1998	South Africa	91–22	Sri Lanka

14 September 1998	Cook Islands	59–59	Wales

14 September 1998	New Zealand	77–41	Malawi

=== Round 2 ===
15 September 1998	South Africa	66–27	Wales

15 September 1998	Malawi	77–24	Sri Lanka

15 September 1998	New Zealand	90–28	Cook Islands

=== Round 3 ===
16 September 1998	South Africa	55–45	Malawi

16 September 1998	Cook Islands	82–50	Sri Lanka

16 September 1998	New Zealand	94–21	Wales

=== Round 4 ===
17 September 1998	South Africa	68–50	Cook Islands

17 September 1998	New Zealand	92–16	Sri Lanka

17 September 1998	Malawi	57–50	Wales

=== Round 5 ===
18 September 1998	Cook Islands	64–63	Malawi

18 September 1998	New Zealand	63–35	South Africa

18 September 1998	Wales	63–45	Sri Lanka

=== Table ===
Pos	Team	P	W	D	L	GF	GA	GD	Pts
1	New Zealand	5	5	0	0	416	141	+275	10
2	South Africa	5	4	0	1	315	207	+108	8
3	Cook Islands	5	2	1	2	283	330	-47	5
4	Malawi	5	2	0	3	283	270	-13	4
5	Wales	5	1	1	3	220	321	-101	3
6	Sri Lanka	5	0	0	5	157	405	-248	0

Qualified for Semi-final 1
Qualified for Semi-final 2

== Playoffs ==
=== Semi-final 1 ===
19 September 1998	Australia	68–38	South Africa

=== Semi-final 2 ===
19 September 1998	New Zealand	70–30	England

=== Bronze medal match ===
21 September 1998	England	56–54	South Africa

=== Gold Medal Match ===
21 September 1998	Australia	42–39	New Zealand

== Medallists ==
Gold	Silver	Bronze
Australia; Coach: Jill McIntosh	New Zealand; Coach: Yvonne Willering	England; Coach: Mary Beardwood
Carissa Tombs; Liz Ellis; Jenny Borlase; Janine Ilitch; Kathryn Harby; Nicole Cusack; Rebecca Sanders; Simone McKinnis; Shelley O'Donnell; Sarah Sutter; Sharelle McMahon; Vicki Wilson (c)	Anna Rowberry; Belinda Blair; Belinda Colling (c); Bernice Mene; Donna Loffhagen; Joanne Steed; Julie Dawson; Lesley Nicol; Linda Vagana; Lorna Suafoa; Noeline Taurua; Sonya Hardcastle	Amanda Newton; Fiona Murtagh (c); Hellen Manufor; Joanne Zinzan; Karen Aspinall; Lisa Stanley; Lorraine Law; Lucia Sdao (vc); Lyn Carpenter; Naomi Siddall; Olivia Murphy; Tracey Neville

== Final Placings ==
Rank	Team
1st place, gold medalist(s)	Australia
2nd place, silver medalist(s)	New Zealand
3rd place, bronze medalist(s)	England
4	South Africa
5	Jamaica
6	Cook Islands
7	Malawi
8	Barbados
9	Wales
10	Canada
11	Malaysia
12	Sri Lanka
