= Sharon Gold (netball) =

New Zealand netball player

Personal information
- Full name: Née: Burridge
- Born: 9 November 1968 (age 58)
- Occupation: Physiotherapist
- Height: 1.90 m (6 ft 3 in)

Netball career
- Playing positions: GD, GK
| Years | National team | Caps |
| 1988-95 | New Zealand | 19 |
Medal record
Representing New Zealand
World Games
| Gold medal – first place | 1989 Karlsruhe | Netball |
Netball World Cup
| Bronze medal – third place | 1995 Birmingham, UK | Tournament |

Sharon Gold is a former netball player who represented the New Zealand national netball team on 19 occasions at the end of the 1980s and in the mid-1990s.

== Netball career ==
Sharon Gold (née Burridge) was born on 9 November 1968. She played netball for Otago, Canterbury and Wellington Region and was chosen for the New Zealand Under-21 team. In 1988 she was selected as the 85th member of the national team, known as the Silver Ferns. She played her first test match on 11 May 1988 in New Zealand, against Trinidad and Tobago. In 1989 she was a member of the winning New Zealand team in the 1989 World Games. The following year, she was a member of the team that lost to Australia in a demonstration match played at the 1990 Commonwealth Games. She played for the team again in 1994 and 1995, competing in the 1995 World Netball Championships, when New Zealand finished third. Gold usually played in the Goal keeper (GK) and Goal defence (GD) positions.

== Personal life ==
Sharon Gold married Rob Gold who is a member of the board of Basketball New Zealand. Their three sons are active basketball players with one, Ben, having been the first New Zealander to be selected to attend the NBA Global Academy at the Australian Institute of Sport in Canberra. She is now a physiotherapist, working in Johnsonville, a suburb in northern Wellington. Gold specialises in sports injury prevention and rehabilitation. Her interest in netball has continued and she was for a time a selector for the Silver Ferns.
