= Ventje Male =

Indonesian powerlifter

Personal information
- Born: 1966 (age 59–60)

Sport
- Country: Indonesia
- Sport: Powerlifting
Medal record
Men's powerlifting
Representing Indonesia
World Games
Gold medal – first place	1989 Karlsruhe	Lightweight
Asian Championships
Gold medal – first place	1988 Takamatsu	52 kg
World Junior Championships
Gold medal – first place	1988 Luxembourg	52 kg

Ventje Male (born 1966) is an Indonesian powerlifter. He was the first Indonesian athlete to win a gold medal at the World Games, achieving this at the 1989 Karlsruhe edition. He won the gold medal in the men's lightweight powerlifting event. He also won the Asian Powerlifting Championship and the World Junior Powerlifting Championship in 1988.
