= Ana Noovao =

New Zealand netball player (1968–2026)

Ana Noovao (6 January 1968 – 9 August 2026) was a New Zealand international netball player who captained the New Zealand national team. She later coached netball, including the Cook Islands national team.

== Early life ==
Ana Noovao Teinaki was born in New Zealand on 6 January 1968, and was of Cook Islands descent. Her brother is Meti Noovao, a former rugby league footballer who played for several clubs in New Zealand and, internationally, for the Cook Islands.

== Netball playing career ==
Playing for the College Rifles club in Auckland, Noovao was selected for the New Zealand Young International team, which toured Canada in 1986. In 1987, she joined the Under-21 team and played in the Netball World Youth Cup in Canberra, Australia in 1998. On 26 April 1989 she played her first game for the Silver Ferns, the New Zealand national netball team and in 1990 was appointed vice-captain. In that year she competed against Australia in a demonstration event at the 1990 Commonwealth Games. She was a silver medal winner with her team in the 1991 World Netball Championships, which were the first championships to be played indoors. Following the retirement of Waimarama Taumaunu, she was made the 15th captain of the Silver Ferns in 1992, having also been captain of the Under-21 team. In all, she played 23 games for the New Zealand national team and later played for two years for the Cook Islands. Noovao was very religious and was reluctant to compete on Sundays.

== Coaching ==
Noovao coached the Cook Islands to seventh place in the 2007 World Netball Championships, held in Auckland. This was a considerable achievement for a country with a population of less than 20,000, although with a large diaspora in New Zealand. Most of the players on the team were based in New Zealand. Noovao also coached at Manurewa High School and Alfriston College, both in Auckland. She later moved to Gladstone, Queensland in Australia, where she played netball for the local team.

== Death ==
Noovao died in Rockhampton, Queensland, on 9 August 2026, at the age of 58.
