= Vicki Wilson (netball) =

Australian netball player and coach (born 1965)

Vicki Wilson OAM
Personal information
- Born: 11 February 1965 (age 61) Brisbane, Australia
- University: Queensland University of Technology

Netball career
- Playing position: GS/GA/GK
Years	Club team	Apps
1997–99	Queensland Firebirds	
Years	National team	Caps
1985–99	Australia	104
Coaching career
- Years: Team
- 2006–09: Queensland Firebirds
- 2016–present: Fiji
Medal record
Representing Australia
World Netball Championships
Gold medal – first place	1999 Christchurch	Team
Gold medal – first place	1995 Birmingham	Team
Gold medal – first place	1991 Sydney	Team
Silver medal – second place	1987 Glasgow	Team
Commonwealth Games
Gold medal – first place	1998 Kuala Lumpur	Team
- Updated on 2009-09-19

Vicki Wilson, OAM, (born 11 February 1965 in Brisbane, Queensland) is an Australian netball coach and retired international player. She is the current head coach of Fiji side. Vicki Wilson is also an executive with the Brisbane Broncos.

== Netball career ==
Wilson was a part of the Australian national netball team for fifteen years, making her debut in 1985. Wilson became captain of the Australian netball team in 1996, while on the comeback trail from a knee injury sustained at the 1995 Netball World Championships. In 1998 she captained Australia to the first ever netball gold medal at the Commonwealth Games and in 1999 she retired on a winning note, after leading Australia to a one-point win in the World Championship final.

Wilson was called up to coach the Queensland Firebirds in 2006, after consistent lacklustre performances in the Commonwealth Bank Trophy. She continued with the franchise in the ANZ Championship, but was stood down from the position by Netball Queensland after the 2009 season.

In May 2013, Wilson was named as the new assistant coach for the New Zealand Silver Ferns until the end of 2015.

In June 2016, she signed to coach the Fiji national netball team side for three years.

== Awards ==
Wilson received the Order of Australia medal in 1992. In 2001, she was inducted into the Australian Institute of Sport 'Best of the Best'. She was inducted into the Sport Australia Hall of Fame in 2004, and the Australian Netball Hall of Fame in November 2008.
