= Carissa Tombs =

Australian netball player

Carissa Tombs OAM
Personal information
- Full name: Carissa Leanne Tombs (née Dalwood)
- Born: 29 November 1969 (age 56) New South Wales, Australia
- Height: 173 cm (5 ft 8 in)
- Spouse: Richard Tombs

Netball career
- Playing position: C
Years	Club team	Apps
1986–1987	Australian Institute of Sport	
1989	Sydney Tigers	
1990	Sydney Pulsar Panthers	
1991	Sydney Pulsars	
1993–1995	Sydney Electricity	
1996	Sydney Energy	
1997–1999	Sydney Sandpipers	25
Years	National team	Caps
1989–1999	Australia	91
Medal record
Representing Australia
Netball World Championships
Gold medal – first place	1991 Australia	Netball
Gold medal – first place	1995 England	Netball
Gold medal – first place	1999 New Zealand	Netball
Commonwealth Games
Gold medal – first place	1998 Malaysia	Netball

Carissa Leanne Tombs OAM (née Dalwood, born 29 November 1969) is a former Australian netball player. Having played for Australia 91 times, she is her country's seventh-most capped international. She won three World Netball Championships, in 1991, 1995 and 1999, and one Commonwealth Games gold medal in 1998.

== Personal life ==
Tombs was born Carissa Dalwood on 29 November 1969 in New South Wales.

Her husband is former Wallaby Richard Tombs, with whom she has three daughters. One of her daughters, Latika, has been a training partner with Giants Netball.

== Netball career ==
=== Club and interstate ===
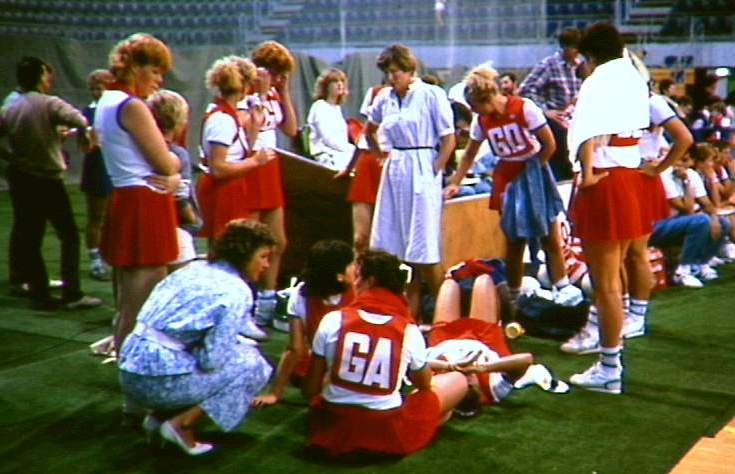
The AIS team in 1986

In state-league competition in New South Wales, Tombs played for Manly-Warringah. She began her top-level netball career at 16 with the Australian Institute of Sport (AIS) team, with whom she played in the Superleague in 1986 and 1987, winning the grand final in 1986.

After leaving the AIS, she played for Sydney-based teams in the Superleague with various nicknames (the Tigers, Pulsar Panthers, Pulsars, Electricity, and Energy) from 1989 to 1991 and 1993 to 1996. She won grand finals with the Tigers in 1989, the Pulsars in 1991 and the Electricity in 1995.

Following the replacement of the Superleague with the National Netball League, she played for the Sydney Sandpipers in the new league from 1997 to 1999. She played 25 games for the team and served as captain in 1999.

In interstate netball, she represented New South Wales. She first appeared for the under-21 side at the age of 16 in 1986, before playing for the under-19 side and finally the seniors, whom she helped to seven consecutive National Netball Championship wins from 1988 to 1994. She captained the team to the title in the last year of that streak.

=== International ===
Tombs was a part of the Australian under-21 side which won the inaugural World Youth Netball Championships in Canberra in 1988. At the senior level, she made her debut for Australia against New Zealand in Auckland on 26 April 1989. She was a regular member of the Australian squad over the next decade, playing 91 times before her retirement in October 1999.

She played in three successful World Netball Championships campaigns for Australia, in 1991, 1995 and 1999, and one successful Commonwealth Games campaign, in 1998. She faced a particular challenge in a knee reconstruction which resulted from an injury sustained in the 1997 National League season, after which she returned to win the 1998 Commonwealth Games gold and 1999 World Championships title. At the World Games, she won a silver medal in 1989 and a gold medal at the following Games in 1993. As of 2023, she is the most capped centre in the Australian national team's history, and the seventh-most capped player overall.

== Honours and achievements ==
- World Netball Championships ×3 (1991, 1995, 1999)
- Commonwealth Games gold medal (1998)
- World Games gold medal (1993), silver medal (1989)
- Medal of the Order of Australia (1992), "[i]n recognition of service to sport, particularly as a member of the 1991 Australian Netball World Champion Netball Squad"
- Australian Sports Medal (2000), for her membership of the New South Wales open team at the 1999 national championships
- Sport Australia Hall of Fame inductee as a player in both the 1991 World Netball Championships–winning Australian team (inducted 2012) and the 1999 World Netball Championships–winning Australian team (inducted 2014)
- Australian Netball Hall of Fame inductee (2010)
- Netball NSW Hall of Fame inductee (2005)
- NSW Hall of Champions inductee (2003)
