= Robin Dillimore =

New Zealand netball player and coach

Personal information
- Full name: Robin Stacey Dillimore
- Born: 27 March 1968 (age 58)
- Height: 1.89 m (6 ft 2 in)

Netball career
- Playing positions: GD, GK
Years	National team	Caps
1989-94	New Zealand	32
Medal record
Representing New Zealand
Netball World Cup
Silver medal – second place	1991 Sydney	Tournament

Robin Dillimore is a former New Zealand netball player who played for her country on 32 occasions, including in the 1991 World Netball Championships.

== Early life ==
Robin Dillimore was born on 27 March 1968. Her mother, Valerie Dillimore (née Morgan), had competed in the 1960 Olympic Games in Rome, Italy as a sprinter, at the age of 16, and had won sprint and long-jump events in national championships. Robin's sister, Carlene, competed in the 1990 Commonwealth Games, held in Auckland, New Zealand.

== Netball career ==
Dillimore played netball for the ASB Collegiate team at the ASB Stadium in Auckland. She played in the Goal keeper (GK) and Goal defence (GD) positions and represented New Zealand at Under-21 and Young International levels. She was first selected for the New Zealand national netball team, in 1989 to play against Australia. She also played at the 1990 Commonwealth Games. In 1991 she was in the team for the 1991 World Netball Championships, when New Zealand was beaten by Australia 53-52 in the final. Dillimore won another international silver medal, this time at the 1993 World Games.

== Later life ==
Dillimore is Team Lead, Shipping Operations for Zespri International Limited, the organisation that markets Kiwifruit from New Zealand. For leisure, she runs marathons.
