= Julie Carter =

New Zealand netball player (born 1965)

Julie Carter (born 1965) was a New Zealand netball player who represented her country on 50 occasions, becoming its captain in 1992.

== Netball career ==
Julie Carter was born on 27 November 1965. She initially played club netball for Waikato, moving to the Wellington PIC team in 1990. She was first selected for the Silver Ferns, the New Zealand national netball team, in 1986, playing her first game against Jamaica. She did not play for the national team in 1987 but became a regular between 1988 and 1993. Towards the end of her time with the Silver Ferns she was captain, leading the team to 10 wins in 11 outings. She represented her country at the 1990 Commonwealth Games, and at the 1991 World Netball Championships when New Zealand won a silver medal. Her last competitive game was in 2000, when she was playing for the Southern Sting. At the time she was living on Stewart Island.

== Coaching ==
After retiring, Carter worked as a coach, including at Waimea College.
