= Tracy Eyrl-Shortland =

New Zealand netball player

Tracy Eyrl-Shortland (née Eyrl) was a New Zealand netball player who played 58 matches for the New Zealand national netball team, known as the Silver Ferns.

== Career ==
In 1980, while playing at for Eastern Netball Club at the Howick Pakuranga Netball Centre, in Pakuranga, Auckland, Eyrl-Shortland was selected for the Auckland Under-16 team. She then moved to the Shore Rovers Netball Club. Eyrl-Shortland first played for the Silver Ferns in 1986. She was a member of the team when New Zealand won the gold medal at the 1987 World Netball Tournament. She was one of four members of that team who were selected to defend the title in 1991 World Netball Championships, when New Zealand won the silver medal, losing 53–52 to Australia in the final. She also competed in the 1989 World Games winning a gold medal. After retiring from playing, she coached netball with the Eastern Netball club. In 2011 she was nominated as a "Legend of Harbour Sport".
