= Waimarama Taumaunu =

New Zealand netball player and coach

Waimarama Taumaunu ONZM MBE
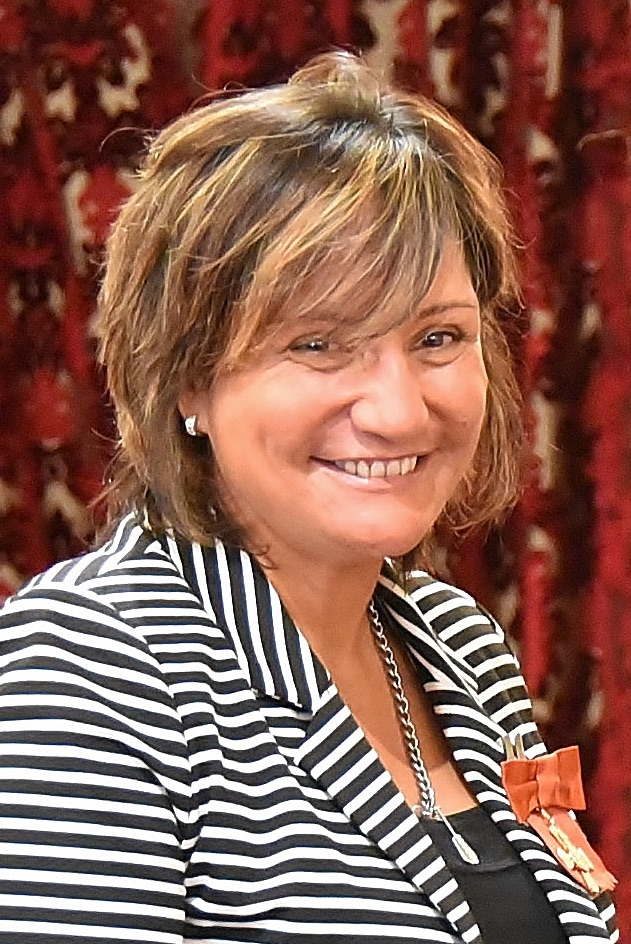
- Taumaunu in 2016

Personal information
- Born: 18 October 1962 (age 64) Waipawa, New Zealand
- Occupation: Netball coach
- Relative: Tiana Metuarau (daughter)

Netball career
- Playing positions: GD, GK, WD
Years	National team	Caps
1981–1991	New Zealand	68
Coaching career
- Years: Team
- 2007: Capital Shakers
- 2008–present: Silver Ferns (asst)
Medal record
Representing New Zealand
World Netball Championships
Silver medal – second place	1983 Singapore	Netball
Gold medal – first place	1987 Glasgow	Netball
Silver medal – second place	1991 Sydney	Netball

Waimarama Taumaunu ONZM MBE (born 18 October 1962), often known as Wai Taumaunu, is a New Zealand netball coach and former international netball player.

== Biography ==
Taumaunu was born in Waipawa, New Zealand. She was a member of New Zealand's national netball team, the Silver Ferns, from 1981 to 1991. During that time, she played in the team that won the 1987 World Netball Tournament, and was also captain of the team in the last three years of her international career.

In 1998, Taumaunu was appointed as national performance director for All England Netball, and remained in that role until 2003. During that time she was also the assistant coach for the England national team in their 2003 World Netball Championships campaign. In 2007, Taumaunu was the head coach of the Capital Shakers in the National Bank Cup.

In the 1992 New Year Honours, Taumaunu was appointed a Member of the Order of the British Empire, for services to netball. She was inducted into the New Zealand Sports Hall of Fame in 1996. Of Ngāti Porou and Ngāi Tahu descent, she was also inducted into the Māori Sports Hall of Fame in 2007. In May 2008, Taumaunu accepted the position of assistant coach for the Silver Ferns, under head coach Ruth Aitken and in October 2011, took over as head coach for the Silver Ferns.

In the 2016 New Year Honours, Taumaunu was appointed an Officer of the New Zealand Order of Merit for services to netball. On 18 October 2026, she was inducted into the Netball New Zealand Hall of Fame.

== Personal life ==
Taumaunu's brother is Heemi Taumaunu, who was appointed chief judge of the District Court in 2019. Her daughter, Tiana Metuarau, is also a netball player, and debuted for the Silver Ferns in September 2021.
