= Michelle den Dekker =

Australian netball player

Michelle den Dekker OAM
Personal information
- Full name: Michelle den Dekker
- Born: 26 March 1966 (age 60)

Netball career
- Playing position: Defence
Years	National team	Caps
1988-95	Australia	89
Coaching career
- Years: Team
- Specialist defence Assistant coach Australian Netball Diamonds
Medal record
Representing Australia
Netball World Championships
Gold medal – first place	1995 Birmingham	Netball
Gold medal – first place	1991 Sydney	Netball
- Updated on 2015-06-24

Michelle den Dekker is an Australian netballer from South Australia. den Dekker represented Australia in 84 tests between 1988 and 1995, including a record 71 as captain. She received the Medal of the Order of Australia (OAM) in the 1992 Queen's Birthday Honours for services to sport.

== Netball career ==
Life member of the Garville Netball Club from 1989 to 1995 and helping the club clinch five premierships in 1989, 1991, 1992, 1994 and 1995. In the national league, den Dekker was captain-coach of the Queensland Firebirds in 1997-98 before returning home to the now defunct Adelaide Ravens.

den Dekker made her Australian debut in 1985, and led Australian to two world championships as captain (1991 and 1995). Michelle played a total of 84 test matches for Australia between 1985 and 1995, including 71 as captain. As captain her team enjoyed a win loss ratio of 92% (65 wins, 6 losses).

den Dekker was voted as Adelaide's greatest netballer to have fronted for the Adelaide Thunderbirds or Adelaide Ravens. She was inducted into the Australian Netball Hall of Fame in 2009.

== Coaching career ==
den Dekker OAM was appointed Head Coach of Netball Australia’s new Centre of Excellence in Canberra in April 2014.

den Dekker was the Diamonds Assistant coach for the Australian Netball Diamonds until August 2015 (the 2015 Netball World Cup). Currently still works as a consultant for Netball Australia as a Defence Specialist coach and manages her own Netball consultancy business working to develop our next generation of players and coaches in South Australia

== Awards ==
- Medal of the Order of Australia (OAM) in 1992
- SA Great Award, for services to sport in South Australia in 1993.
- Inducted into the Australian Netball Hall of Fame 2009
- Inducted into the Inaugural South Australian Hall Of Fame 2010
- Ambassador for the SA Sports Hall Of Fame alongside Legend Barrie Robran AM.
- Inducted into Sport Australia Hall of Fame in 2020.

== External sources ==
- Michelle de Dekker
- Netball Australia
