= Bernice Mene =

New Zealand netball international

Bernice Mene MNZM
Personal information
- Full name: Bernice Papasina Mene
- Born: 18 January 1975 (age 51)
- Height: 1.88 m (6 ft 2 in)
- Spouse: Dion Nash
- Relatives: Sally Mene (mother); Chris Sua'mene (brother)
- School: Villa Maria College
- University: Victoria University; Dunedin College of Education

Netball career
- Playing positions: GD, GK
Years	Club team	Apps
1992–1994	Canterbury NPC	
1995–1996	Wellington NPC	
2000	Southland NPC	
1998–2002	Southern Sting	
Years	National team	Caps
1992–2001	New Zealand	76
Medal record
Representing New Zealand
World Youth Netball Championships
Gold medal – first place	1992 Suva	Team
Silver medal – second place	1996 Toronto	Team
World Netball Championships
Silver medal – second place	1999 Christchurch	Team
Bronze medal – third place	1995 Birmingham	Team
Commonwealth Games
Silver medal – second place	1998 Kuala Lumpur	Team
World Games
Silver medal – second place	1993 The Hague	Team

Bernice Papasina Mene MNZM (born 18 January 1975) is a former New Zealand netball international. Between 1992 and 2001, Mene made 76 senior appearances for New Zealand. She represented New Zealand at the 1993 World Games, the 1998 Commonwealth Games and the 1995 and 1999 World Netball Championships. She captained New Zealand during 2000 and 2001 seasons. Between 1998 and 2002, during the Coca-Cola Cup/National Bank Cup era, she captained Southern Sting as they won four premierships. In 2003, Mene was appointed a Member of the New Zealand Order of Merit, for services to netball. In 2022, she was included on a list of the 25 best players to feature in netball leagues in New Zealand since 1998.

== Early life, family and education ==
Mene is the daughter of Iafeta Sua'Mene and Sally Mene. She is of Samoan descent. Her father, also known as Mene Mene, migrated from Samoa. Her parents were both athletes and they both represented New Zealand at the 1974 Commonwealth Games. Her father competed in the decathlon while her mother competed in both the javelin and discus. She has two brothers who are also athletes. Chris Sua'mene represented Samoa in the discus at the 1996 Summer Olympics, and Nathan Sua'Mene represented Samoa in the high jump at the 1998 Commonwealth Games. Between 1988 and 1992, Mene attended Villa Maria College, Christchurch. Between 1995 and 1996 she attended the Victoria University of Wellington where she gained a Bachelor of Arts in Linguistics. In 2009 she received the university's Distinguished Alumni Award. Between 1999 and 2000 she attended the Dunedin College of Education in Invercargill, where she gained a Diploma in Secondary Education and Teaching. In March 2003, she married Dion Nash, a former New Zealand cricket international. Together they have three children. In 2010 Mene posed topless while heavily pregnant, Demi Moore-style for New Zealand Woman's Weekly.

== Playing career ==
=== National Provincial Championships ===
In 1992, aged just 16, Mene made her senior debut for Canterbury in the National Provincial Championships. She played for Canterbury between 1992 and 1994, Wellington in 1995 and 1996 and Southland in 2000.

=== Southern Sting ===
Between 1998 and 2002, Mene played for Southern Sting in the Coca-Cola Cup/National Bank Cup league. She captained Sting as they won four premierships, winning titles in 1999, 2000, 2001 and 2002. Mene was one of the first professional netball players in New Zealand. She retired from senior netball at the end of the 2002 season. On 23 July 2018, Mene, together with Donna Wilkins, Belinda Colling and Natalie Avellino, played for Sting in a charity match against Netball South of the National Netball League. The match marked Sting's 20th anniversary. In April 2022, she was included on a list of the 25 best players to feature in netball leagues in New Zealand since 1998.

=== New Zealand ===
Between 1992 and 2001, Mene made 76 senior appearances for New Zealand. On 7 November 1992, aged just 17, she made her senior debut against England during an away tour. At the time she was still attending Villa Maria College. She had previously represented New Zealand at the 1992 World Youth Netball Championships. She subsequently represented New Zealand at the 1993 World Games, the 1998 Commonwealth Games and the 1995 and 1999 World Netball Championships. She captained New Zealand at the 1996 World Youth Netball Championships. In 1997, aged just 22, she captained the senior New Zealand team for the first time. During her playing career Mene, regularly suffered with a degenerative knee condition. Shortly after being first appointed captain, she had an injury-enforced break. She again captained New Zealand during 2000 and 2001 seasons. In 2001 she captained New Zealand as they won a Tri Nations Series that also featured Australia and South Africa. In February 2002, she announced her retirement from international netball.

Tournaments	Place
1992 World Youth Netball Championships	1st place, gold medalist(s)
1993 World Games	2nd place, silver medalist(s)
1995 World Netball Championships	3rd place, bronze medalist(s)
1996 World Youth Netball Championships	2nd place, silver medalist(s)
1998 Commonwealth Games	2nd place, silver medalist(s)
1999 World Netball Championships	2nd place, silver medalist(s)

== Teacher ==
During the early 2000s, Mene worked as a teacher at Mount Albert Grammar School. Her subjects included French, German and English. In 2000 she established the MAGS Netball Academy. Subsequent graduates of the academy have included Maria Tutaia, Maia Wilson, Jamie-Lee Price and Erikana Pedersen.

== Television ==
In 2005, Mene was a contestant on New Zealand's Dancing with the Stars. She has also worked as a netball commentator for Sky Sport (New Zealand). Together with Tania Dalton, Anna Stanley, Natalie Avellino and Kathryn Harby-Williams, she was part of their commentary team for the 2007 and 2011 World Netball Championships.

Date	TV series	Channel	Role	Episode
2001	The Machine		Contestant	
2001	What Now! 20th Birthday Special	TVNZ 2	Self	
2005	Dancing with the Stars	TV One	Contestant	6 episodes
2006	Bro'Town		Self (voice)	1 episode

== Constitutional Advisory Panel ==
Between 2011 and 2013, Mene served on the New Zealand Constitutional Advisory Panel.

== Honours ==
New Zealand

- World Netball Championships
  - Runners Up: 1995, 1999
- Commonwealth Games
  - Runners Up: 1998
- World Games
  - Runners up: 1993
- World Youth Netball Championships
  - Winners: 1992

Southern Sting

- Coca-Cola Cup/National Bank Cup
  - Winners: 1999, 2000, 2001, 2002
  - Runners Up: 1998

Individual Awards

Year	Award
2003	New Zealand Order of Merit
