= Rugby union in Gibraltar =

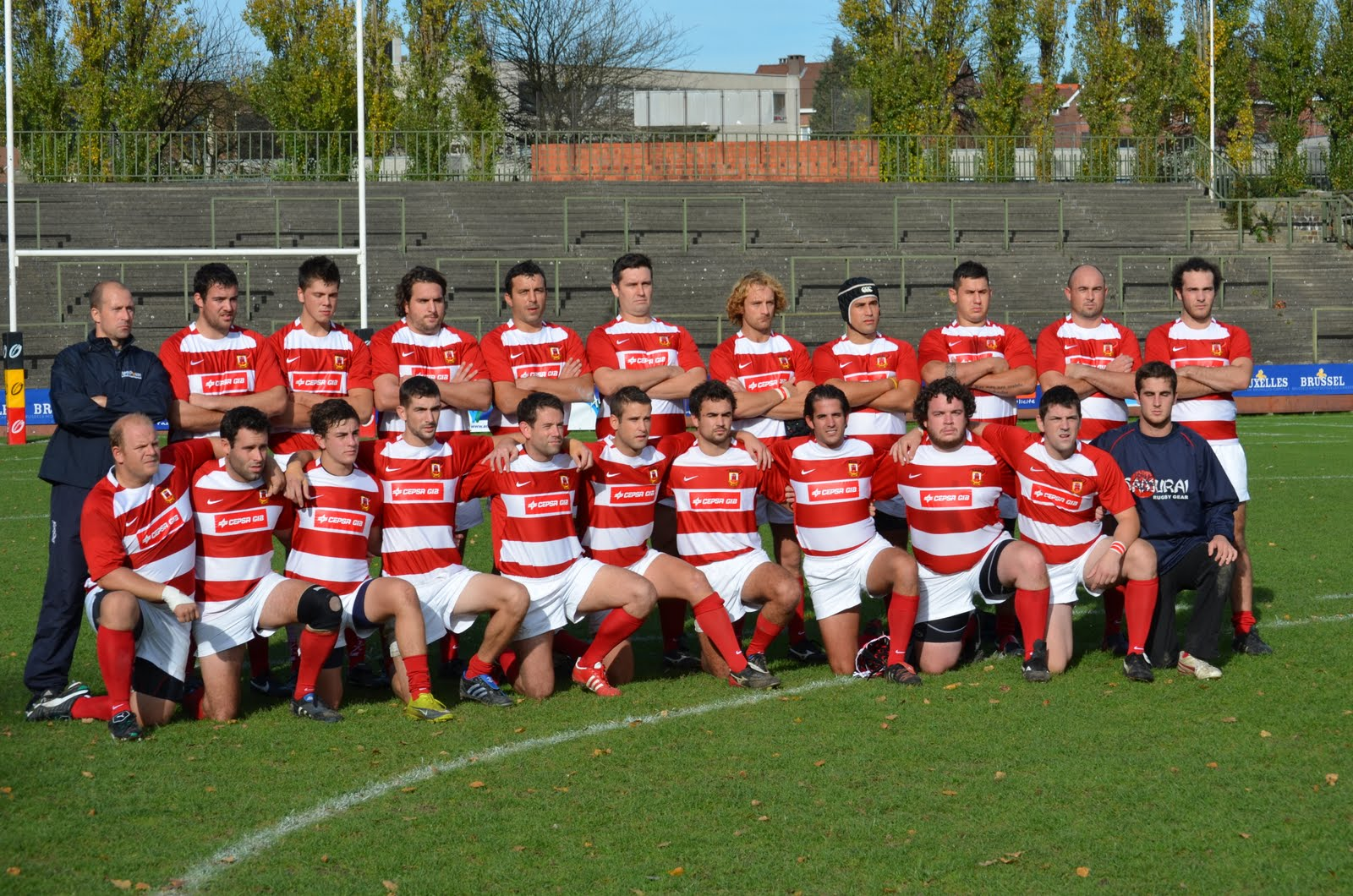
- Country: Gibraltar
- Governing body: Gibraltar Rugby Football Union
- National team: Gibraltar
- Nickname: GRFU
- First played: late 19th century
- Clubs: 4

Rugby union is a popular sport since its introduction by British military personnel in the 19th century.

== Governing body ==
The Gibraltar Rugby Football Union (GRFU) has existed since the 1980s when the border with Spain was opened.

Rugby is played in Gibraltar under the auspices of the GRFU, which exists for the development of the game on the Rock. In 2010 the GRFU appointed a Development Officer to promote the sport in middle schools and comprehensive schools.

== History ==
Gibraltar is a British Overseas Territory, it has long had a rugby presence, and the game was probably introduced at some point during the 19th century by the military.

Around World War II, a number of Gibraltarians were evacuated to the United Kingdom, and some learned rugby while at school there or in the British Armed Forces.

Teams of Gibraltarians have been bolstered by the constant coming and going of the British Armed Forces, who traditionally had strong teams. During the mid-1960s, a mini league was set up - just in time, as the land border with Spain would close in 1968. This league was dominated by Gibraltar RFC.

Even up to the mid-1980s, rugby on the Rock had a major problem, namely the lack of grass. Games were frequently played on a rocky surface, and visitors had to play tag rugby. Peter Collings, a former St Mary's University, Blackburn and Leek winger, the Headmaster of St George's School, and others like Geoff Dunn of the Bat and Bull pub, kept Rugby alive via the tag game. Peter Collings was a one-man band for some ten years. He played and refereed, organised fixtures, the disciplinary committee and the pitch allocations. Fixtures occurred most weekends at the Devils Tower pitch and at Navy No 1 on Queensway. There were also regular and well attended Rugby Sevens events that took place, with recorded coverage from GBC television on John Shepherd's sports programmes. Tag rugby had its limitations, but with regular trips to play in Tangier against Moroccan and French teams, it allowed Rugby skills to flourish and for the game to stay alive in Gibraltar during the 1970s and 1980s when travel to Spain was impractical.

With the opening of the border in the 1980s, the huge demand by military personnel and returning local, university students led to the creation of Gibraltar's first national league. The original teams within this competition were teams from: Navy, Air Force, Army, La Linea and two Gibraltarian teams. This later increased with the introduction of the Spanish settlements of Ceuta and Cádiz to the league. The decline in this league was down to a number of factors, such as the decline in military personnel in Gibraltar as well as the increase in the number of Spanish teams taking part in the Andalucian League (FAR) and the lack of investment in youth development locally. The land border reopened in 1985, and a number of games were played against sides from Seville and Madrid. Gibraltar RFC has now merged with one of the Super4s clubs. A number of Gibraltar-based players play for the Barbarians RFC, an Andalucia Rugby Team that play in the Andalusia Divisions.

== National team ==
On 5 November 2011 the Gibraltar Rugby Football Union (GRFU) fielded a national team in its first official Test Match. The fixture was against the Belgium Development Team in Brussels. The final score was Belgium XV 20 Gibraltar XV 8. Test Caps have been awarded to the Gibraltar Team.

The GRFU is currently going through the process of FIRA/AER (European Rugby Federation) membership. The GRFU is planning other international fixtures versus international opponents for April 2015.

There is also a Gibraltar National sevens team that plays regularly in tournaments, particularly in the Tangier Sevens.

- see Gibraltar national rugby union team

== Domestic structure ==
The lack of a decent playing pitch was long a problem, however the laying of a 3rd generation (IRB Approved) astroturf pitch has meant that Gibraltarian teams have been allowed to play their first game of XVs on their home field. The new surface was laid in April 2010 and the first game played on the pitch was against a touring side. The historic first encounter between a Spanish and Gibraltarian side (U20s) was held in September 2010, against Marbella RFC

In 2011 the GRFU hosted its first, locally based, international Sevens tournament called "The Rock 7s".

=== The Gibraltar Rugby Championship ===
Gibraltar's National League is played amongst the four local clubs: DHL Europa Stormers, Inline Framing Straits Sharks, Ibex Buccaneers, Rock Scorpions. The aim of the GRC is to give Gibraltar's young, aspiring rugby players a platform from which to continue their rugby development pathway.

=== Gibraltar Minis ===
Gibraltar Minis came into existence in 2011.

== Notable players ==
- Jeremy Campbell-Lamerton, born Gibraltar, capped for Scotland three times.

Harvey Armstrong record points scorer with 36 as of 14/10/16
