= 2026–27 Rugby Europe International Championships =

- Date: 26 September 2026 – TBA
- Countries: 33

Tournament statistics
- Champions: Championship Trophy Conference Croatia (2)
- Matches played: 22
- Attendance: 9,979 (454 per match)
- Tries scored: 1,178 (53.55 per match)

The 2026–27 Rugby Europe International Championships is the European Championship for tier 2 and tier 3 rugby union nations.

== Countries ==
Pre-tournament World Rugby rankings in parentheses.

Championship
Group A

- Belgium (22)
- Georgia (13)
- Poland ↑ (30)
- Romania (21)

Group B

- Netherlands (27)
- Portugal * (20)
- Spain (15)
- Switzerland (28)

Trophy

- Czech Republic * (29)
- Germany ↓ (35)
- Denmark (58)
- Lithuania (54)
- Malta ↑ (44)
- Sweden (34)

Conference
Pool A

- Estonia (NR)
- Finland (77)
- Luxembourg • (53)
- Norway (101)

Pool D

- Andorra (79)
- Cyprus (NR)
- Gibraltar † (NR)
- Israel (63)

Pool B

- Austria • (64)
- Croatia ↓ (56)
- Serbia (69)
- Slovenia (82)

Pool E

- Greece (112)
- Kosovo (NR)
- Montenegro (NR)

Pool C

- Bulgaria (73)
- Moldova (57)
- Ukraine • (51)
- Turkey (84)

Legend:
* Champion of 2025–26 season; ↑ Promoted from lower division during 2025–26 season; • Division Champion but not promoted during 2025–26 season; ‡ Last place inside own division but not relegated during 2025–26; ↓ Relegated from higher division during 2025–26 season; † Debut season

== 2027 Rugby Europe Championship ==
=== Group A ===
Pos	Team	Pld	W	D	L	PF	PA	PD	TF	TA	TB	LB	Pts	Qualification
1	Belgium	0	0	0	0	0	0	0	0	0	0	0	0	Grand Finals Semi-Finals
2	Georgia	0	0	0	0	0	0	0	0	0	0	0	0	Grand Finals Semi-Finals
3	Poland	0	0	0	0	0	0	0	0	0	0	0	0	Ranking Finals Semi-Finals
4	Romania	0	0	0	0	0	0	0	0	0	0	0	0	Ranking Finals Semi-Finals

First match(es) will be played: unknown. Source: Rugby Europe
Rules for classification:
If two teams have the same number of points the best ranked will be: 1) match points in the games played between the tied Unions; 2) tries in the games played between the tied Unions; 3) match points difference in all pool games; 4) tries difference for in all pool games; 5) match points for in all pool games.
If three or more teams have same number of points, the best ranked will be: 1) match points difference in all pool games; 2) tries for in all pool games; 4) match points for in all pool games.
Points were awarded to the teams as follows: Win – 4 points, Draw – 2 points, At least 3 more tries than opponent – 1 point, Loss within 7 points – 1 point

=== Group B ===
Pos	Team	Pld	W	D	L	PF	PA	PD	TF	TA	TB	LB	Pts	Qualification
1	Netherlands	0	0	0	0	0	0	0	0	0	0	0	0	Grand Finals Semi-Finals
2	Portugal	0	0	0	0	0	0	0	0	0	0	0	0	Grand Finals Semi-Finals
3	Spain	0	0	0	0	0	0	0	0	0	0	0	0	Ranking Finals Semi-Finals
4	Switzerland	0	0	0	0	0	0	0	0	0	0	0	0	Ranking Finals Semi-Finals

First match(es) will be played: unknown. Source: Rugby Europe
Rules for classification:
If two teams have the same number of points the best ranked will be: 1) competition points; 2) match points difference; 3) match tries difference; 3) match points difference in all pool games; 4) tries for in all pool games; 5) match points for in all pool games.
If three or more teams have same number of points, the best ranked will be: 1) competition points; 2) tries for in all pool games; 3) match points for in all pool games.
Points were awarded to the teams as follows: Win – 4 points, Draw – 2 points, At least 3 more tries than opponent – 1 point, Loss within 7 points – 1 point

Matches
Group Stage

6 February 2027
12:30 CET (UTC+1)

Netherlands	v	Spain

NRCA Stadium, Amsterdam
Referee: TBA

6 February 2027
15:15 CET (UTC+1)

Belgium	v	Romania

TBA
Referee: TBA

6 February 2027
19:30 CET (UTC+1)

Poland	v	Georgia

Narodowy Stadion Rugby, Gdynia
Referee: TBA

7 February 2027
13:00 CET (UTC+1)

Switzerland	v	Portugal

Stade Municipal Yverdon, Yverdon-les-Bains
Referee: TBA

12 February 2027
18:00 EET (UTC+2)

Romania	v	Poland

Arcul de Triumf Stadium, Bucharest
Referee: TBA

13 February 2027
13:00 CET (UTC+1)

Netherlands	v	Portugal

NRCA Stadium, Amsterdam
Referee: TBA

13 February 2027
20:00 CET (UTC+1)

Belgium	v	Georgia

TBA
Referee: TBA

14 February 2027
12:30 CET (UTC+1)

Spain	v	Switzerland

Estadio Nacional Complutense, Madrid
Referee: TBA

20 February 2027
18:00 CET (UTC+1)

Georgia	v	Romania

Avchala Rugby Stadium, Tbilisi
Referee: TBA

20-February 2027
19:30 CET (UTC+1)

Poland	v	Belgium

Narodowy Stadion Rugby, Gdynia
Referee: TBA

21 February 2027
13:00 CET (UTC+1)

Switzerland	v	Netherlands

Stade Municipal Yverdon, Yverdon-les-Bains
Referee: TBA

21 February 2027
16:30 WET (UTC+0)

Portugal	v	Spain

TBA
Referee: TBA

Ranking Finals

=== Semi-Finals ===
6-7 March 2027
TBA

TBA	v	TBA

TBA
Referee: TBA

6-7 March 2027
TBA

TBA	v	TBA

TBA
Referee: TBA

=== Seventh Place Final ===
TBA
TBA

TBA	v	TBA

TBA
Referee: TBA

=== Fifth Place Final ===
TBA
TBA

TBA	v	TBA

TBA
Referee: TBA

Grand Finals

=== Semi-Finals ===
6-7 March 2027
TBA

TBA	v	TBA

TBA
Referee: TBA

6-7 March 2027
TBA

TBA	v	TBA

TBA
Referee: TBA

=== Bronze Final ===
TBA
TBA

TBA	v	TBA

TBA
Referee: TBA

=== Cup Final ===
TBA
TBA

TBA	v	TBA

TBA
Referee: TBA

== 2026–27 Rugby Europe Trophy ==
Champions and advances to Promotion/relegation play-off
Relegated to Rugby Europe Conference

Pos	Team	Pld	W	D	L	PF	PA	PD	TF	TA	TB	LB	Pts
1	Czech Republic	3	3	0	0	114	72	+42	18	10	2	0	14
2	Malta	3	3	0	0	109	82	+27	14	13	0	0	12
3	Germany	3	2	0	1	151	63	+88	22	8	2	1	11
4	Sweden	3	1	0	2	122	89	+33	20	13	1	2	7
5	Lithuania	3	0	0	3	49	145	−96	6	23	0	0	0
6	Denmark	3	0	0	3	60	154	−94	10	23	0	0	0

Updated to match(es) played on 14 November 2026. Source: Rugby Europe
Rules for classification:
If two teams have the same number of points the best ranked will be: 1) match points in the games played between the tied Unions; 2) tries in the games played between the tied Unions; 3) match points difference in all pool games; 4) tries difference for in all pool games; 5) match points for in all pool games.
If three or more teams have same number of points, the best ranked will be: 1) match points difference in all pool games; 2) tries for in all pool games; 4) match points for in all pool games.
Points were awarded to the teams as follows: Win – 4 points, Draw – 2 points, At least 3 more tries than opponent – 1 point, Loss within 7 points – 1 point

Matches

31 October 2026
13:00 CET (UTC+1)

Denmark	17–36	Malta
	Report

Erritsø Rugby Stadium, Fredericia
Attendance: 500
Referee: (Germany) Paul Warman

31 October 2026
14:00 EET (UTC+2)

Lithuania	7–54	Germany (1 TBP)
	Report

Rugby Stadium Gardino, Šiauliai
Attendance: 400
Referee: (Monaco) Wissam Baamara

31 October 2026
14:00 CET (UTC+1)

(1 LBP) Sweden	28–31	Czech Republic
	Report

Trelleborg Rugby Arena, Trelleborg
Attendance: 400
Referee: (Denmark) Emmanuel Jasques

7 November 2026
13:00 CET (UTC+1)

Denmark	24–52	Czech Republic (1 TBP)
	Report

Erritsø Rugby Stadium, Fredericia
Attendance: n/a
Referee: (Romania) Nicolae Fratila

7 November 2026
14:00 EET (UTC+2)

Lithuania	22–60	Sweden (1 TBP)
	Report

Rugby Stadium Gardino, Siauliai
Attendance: 350
Referee: (Poland) Lech Mieszko

7 November 2026
14:30 CEST (UTC+2)

Malta	37–31	Germany (1 LBP)
	Report

Tony Bezzina Stadium, Paola
Attendance: n/a
Referee: (Croatia) Luka Lerotic

14 November 2026
13:30 CET (UTC+1)

(1 TBP) Germany	66–19	Denmark
	Report

Rugby-Park Köln, Cologne
Attendance: 2,350
Referee: (Netherlands) Katherine Ritchie

14 November 2026
14:00 CEST (UTC+2)

Malta	37–34	Sweden (1 LBP)
	Report

Tony Bezzina Stadium, Paola
Attendance: 1,600
Referee: (Switzerland) Ethan Glass

14 November 2026
20:40 CET (UTC+1)

(1 TBP) Czech Republic	31–20	Lithuania
	Report

Marketa Stadium, Prague
Attendance: 200
Referee: (Spain) Alberto Diaz

27 February 2027

Malta	v	Czech Republic

Tony Bezzina Stadium, Paola

6 March 2027
13:00 CET (UTC+1)

Czech Republic	v	Germany

Marketa Stadium, Prague

27 March 2027

Germany	v	Sweden

Fritz-Grunebaum-Sportpark, Heidelberg

27 March 2027
14:00 CET (UTC+1)

Denmark	v	Lithuania

TBC

2 April 2027

Sweden	v	Denmark

TBC

2 April 2027

Lithuania	v	Malta

TBC

== 2026–27 Rugby Europe Conference ==
=== Pool A ===
Champions

Pos	Team	Pld	W	D	L	PF	PA	PD	TF	TA	TB	LB	Pts	Qualification or relegation
1	Luxembourg	2	2	0	0	147	17	+130	23	3	2	0	10	Possibly advances to Promotion play-off
2	Finland	1	1	0	0	34	3	+31	6	0	1	0	5	
3	Norway	1	0	0	1	12	41	−29	2	7	0	0	0	
4	Estonia	2	0	0	2	8	140	−132	1	22	0	0	0	

Updated to match(es) played on =10 October 2026. Source: Rugby Europe
Rules for classification:
If two teams have the same number of points the best ranked will be:1) match points in the games played between the tied Unions; 2) tries in the games played between the tied Unions; 3) match points difference in all pool games; 4) tries difference for in all pool games; 5) match points for in all pool games.
If three or more teams have same number of points, the best ranked will be: 1) match points difference in all pool games; 2) tries for in all pool games; 4) match points for in all pool games.
Points were awarded to the teams as follows: Win – 4 points, Draw – 2 points, At least 3 more tries than opponent – 1 point, Loss within 7 points – 1 point

Matches

10 October 2026
14:00 EEST (UTC+3)

(1 TBP) Finland	34–3	Estonia
	Report

Ruutisavu Areena, Vantaa
Attendance: 100
Referee: (Switzerland) James Thomas

17 October 2026
12:00 EEST (UTC+3)

Estonia	5–106	Luxembourg (1 TBP)
	Report

National Cricket and Rugby Field, Tallinn
Attendance: 100
Referee: (Ukraine) Vlad Iinvytskyi

24 October 2026
15:00 CEST (UTC+2)

(1 TBP) Luxembourg	41–12	Norway
	Report

Stade de Luxembourg, Luxembourg City
Attendance: 1,200
Referee: (Poland) Dominik Jastrzebski

24 April 2027

Luxembourg	v	Finland

TBA
Referee: TBA

24 April 2027

Norway	v	Estonia

Referee: TBA

8 May 2027

Finland	v	Norway

Referee: TBA

=== Pool B ===
Champions

Pos	Team	Pld	W	D	L	PF	PA	PD	TF	TA	TB	LB	Pts	Qualification or relegation
1	Croatia	3	3	0	0	104	31	+73	17	4	2	0	14	Possibly advances to Promotion play-off
2	Austria	2	1	0	1	54	43	+11	8	7	1	1	6	
3	Slovenia	2	0	0	2	27	89	−62	4	16	0	0	0	
4	Serbia	1	0	0	1	5	27	−22	1	4	0	0	0	

Updated to match(es) played on 10 October 2026. Source: Rugby Europe
Rules for classification:
If two teams have the same number of points the best ranked will be: 1) match points in the games played between the tied Unions; 2) tries in the games played between the tied Unions; 3) match points difference in all pool games; 4) tries difference for in all pool games; 5) match points for in all pool games.
If three or more teams have same number of points, the best ranked will be: 1) match points difference in all pool games; 2) tries for in all pool games; 4) match points for in all pool games.
Points were awarded to the teams as follows: Win – 4 points, Draw – 2 points, At least 3 more tries than opponent – 1 point, Loss within 7 points – 1 point

Matches

3 October 2026
14:00 CEST (UTC+2)

(1 TBP) Croatia	27–5	Serbia
	Report

Gradski stadion, Sinj
Attendance: 500
Referee: (Belgium) Geoffrey Serralbo

3 October 2026
14:00 CEST (UTC+2)

Slovenia	19–36	Austria (1 TBP)
	Report

Oval Stadion, Ljubljana
Attendance: 150
Referee: (Moldova) Valeriu Chipercean

10 October 2026
14:00 CEST (UTC+2)

Austria	18–24	Croatia
	Report

Sepp-Doll-Stadion, Krems an der Donau
Attendance: 400
Referee: (Germany) Paul Warman

17 October 2026
14:00 CEST (UTC+2)

(1 TBP) Croatia	53–8	Slovenia
	Report

Attendance: 250
Referee: (Romania) Andrei Ballok

17 April 2027

Serbia	v	Austria

TBA, Belgrade
Referee: TBA

24 April 2027
14:00 CEST (UTC+2)

Slovenia	v	Serbia

Oval Stadium, Ljubljana
Referee: TBA

=== Pool C ===
Champions

Pos	Team	Pld	W	D	L	PF	PA	PD	TF	TA	TB	LB	Pts	Qualification or relegation
1	Ukraine	1	1	0	0	53	0	+53	9	0	1	0	5	Possibly advances to Promotion play-off
2	Bulgaria	1	0	1	0	31	31	0	5	3	0	0	2	
3	Turkey	2	0	1	1	31	84	−53	4	13	0	0	2	
4	Moldova	0	0	0	0	0	0	0	0	0	0	0	0	

Updated to match(es) played on 3 October 2026. Source: Rugby Europe
Rules for classification:
If two teams have the same number of points the best ranked will be: 1) match points in the games played between the tied Unions; 2) tries in the games played between the tied Unions; 3) match points difference in all pool games; 4) tries difference for in all pool games; 5) match points for in all pool games.
If three or more teams have same number of points, the best ranked will be: 1) match points difference in all pool games; 2) tries for in all pool games; 4) match points for in all pool games.
Points were awarded to the teams as follows: Win – 4 points, Draw – 2 points, At least 3 more tries than opponent – 1 point, Loss within 7 points – 1 point

Matches

26 September 2026
14:00 EEST (UTC+3)

(1 TBP) Ukraine	53–0	Turkey
	Report

Dinamo Stadium, Chișinău
Attendance: 75
Referee: (Austria) Filippos Manolopoulos

3 October 2026
15:00 TRT UTC+3)

Turkey	31–31	Bulgaria
	Report

Esenboga Spor Tesisleri, Ankara
Attendance: 200
Referee: (Czech Republic) Raymond Burnand

10 April 2027

Bulgaria	v	Ukraine

Referee: TBA

24 April 2027

Moldova	v	Bulgaria

Dinamo Stadium, Chișinău
Referee: TBA

1 May 2026
14:00 EEST (UTC+3)

Moldova	v	Ukraine

Dinamo Stadium, Chișinău
Referee: TBA

8 May 2026

Turkey	v	Moldova

Referee: TBA

=== Pool D ===
Champions

Pos	Team	Pld	W	D	L	PF	PA	PD	TF	TA	TB	LB	Pts	Qualification or relegation
1	Cyprus	1	1	0	0	48	17	+31	8	2	1	0	5	Possibly advances to Promotion play-off
2	Israel	1	1	0	0	32	20	+12	4	2	0	0	4	
3	Andorra	1	0	0	1	20	32	−12	2	4	0	0	0	
4	Gibraltar	1	0	0	1	17	48	−31	2	8	0	0	0	

First match(es) will be played: 17 October 2026. Source: Rugby Europe
Rules for classification:
If two teams have the same number of points the best ranked will be: 1) match points in the games played between the tied Unions; 2) tries in the games played between the tied Unions; 3) match points difference in all pool games; 4) tries difference for in all pool games; 5) match points for in all pool games.
If three or more teams have same number of points, the best ranked will be: 1) match points difference in all pool games; 2) tries for in all pool games; 4) match points for in all pool games.
Points were awarded to the teams as follows: Win – 4 points, Draw – 2 points, At least 3 more tries than opponent – 1 point, Loss within 7 points – 1 point

Matches

17 October 2026
16:00 CEST (UTC+2)

Gibraltar	17–48	Cyprus (1 TBP)
	Report

Europa Sports Park, Gibraltar
Attendance: 650
Referee: (Latvia) Vadims Galajevs

17 October 2026
17:00 CET (UTC +1)

Israel	32–20	Andorra
	Report

Estadi Nacional, Andorra la Vella
Attendance: 500
Referee: (Portugal) Melo Antonio

16 January 2027

Gibraltar	v	Andorra

Referee: TBA

3 April 2027

Cyprus	v	Israel

Referee: TBA

17 April 2027

Israel	v	Gibraltar

Referee: TBA

17 April 2027

Andorra	v	Cyprus

Referee: TBA

=== Pool E ===
Champions

Pos	Team	Pld	W	D	L	PF	PA	PD	TF	TA	TB	LB	Pts	Qualification or relegation
1	Greece	1	1	0	0	65	0	+65	11	0	1	0	5	Possibly advances to Promotion play-off
2	Montenegro	1	1	0	0	38	27	+11	6	4	0	0	4	
3	Kosovo	2	0	0	2	27	103	−76	4	17	0	0	0	

Updated to match(es) played on 10 October 2026. Source: Rugby Europe
Rules for classification:
If two teams have the same number of points the best ranked will be: 1) match points in the games played between the tied Unions; 2) tries in the games played between the tied Unions; 3) match points difference in all pool games; 4) tries difference for in all pool games; 5) match points for in all pool games.
If three or more teams have same number of points, the best ranked will be: 1) match points difference in all pool games; 2) tries for in all pool games; 4) match points for in all pool games.
Points were awarded to the teams as follows: Win – 4 points, Draw – 2 points, At least 3 more tries than opponent – 1 point, Loss within 7 points – 1 point

Matches

26 September 2026
14:00 CEST (UTC+2)

Kosovo	27–38	Montenegro
	Report

Demush Mavraj Stadium, Istog
Attendance: 100
Referee: (Hungary) Kudzaiishe Wazara

10 October 2026
12:30 EEST (UTC+3)

(1 TBP) Greece	65–0	Kosovo
	Report

Municipal Stadium of Keratsini Panagiotis Salpeas, Keratsini
Attendance: 250
Referee: (Germany) Joshua Jahn

10 April 2026

Montenegro	v	Greece

Referee: TBA

== Play-offs ==
=== Championship–Trophy promotion/relegation play-off ===
v

=== Conference promotion to Trophy play-off ===
TBA
TBA

TBA	v	TBA

TBA
Referee: TBA
