= Jayda Pechova =

English professional netball player (born 2004)

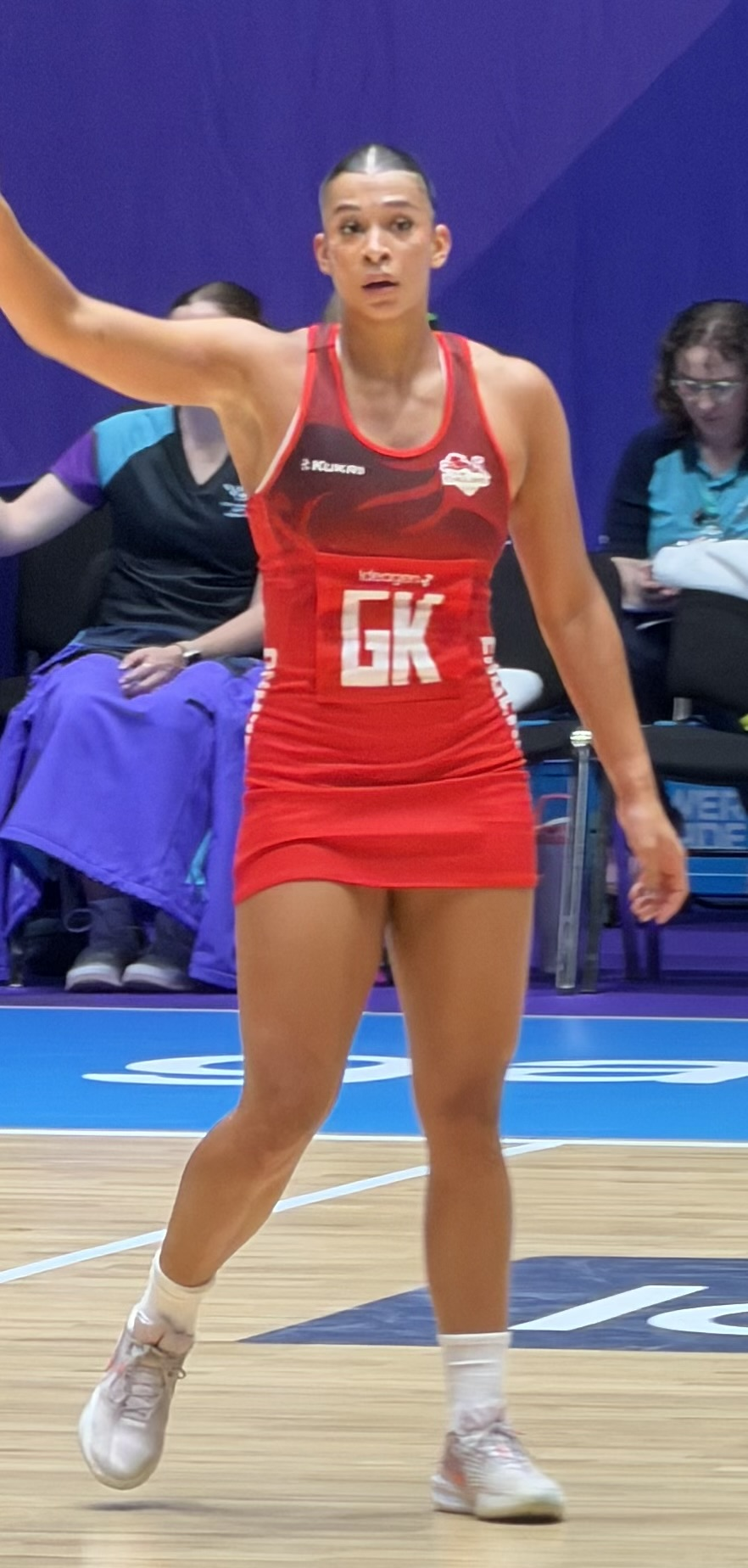
- Pechova at the 2026 Commonwealth Games

Personal information
- Born: 21 August 2004 (age 22) Fleet, Hampshire, England
- Height: 183 cm (6 ft 0 in)
- School: Gordon's School
- University: University of Bath

Netball career
- Playing positions: GK, GD
Years	Club team	Apps
2022	London Pulse	
2023–2024	Team Bath	
2025–present	Nottingham Forest Netball	
Years	National team	Caps
2022–present	England	6
- Updated on May 2026

Jayda Pechova (born 20 August 2004) is an English international netball player. She plays for Nottingham Forest Netball in the Netball Super League and is part of the England Roses.

== Early life and education ==
Pechova grew up in Fleet and played for Weston Park Blades netball club. She attended Gordon's School and went on to study Sports Management at the University of Bath, where she received the Trendell Scholarship. She is of Czech descent through her mother, and uses her mother's last name since her parents never married.

== Club career ==
=== London Pulse ===
Pechova came through the London Pulse pathway where she was part of the squad which won the 2022 National Performance Grand Final (Under-21s) and were runners-up in the 2022 National Performance League (Under-21s). She was named as a training partner for the 2022 season and made her Netball Super League debut aged 17 in a match against Team Bath.

=== Team Bath ===
Pechova signed for Team Bath ahead of the 2023 season, playing netball alongside studying at the University of Bath. In late 2022 she was nominated for SportsAid's One-to-Watch Award and BBC's Young Sports Personality of the Year. Pechova spent two seasons at Team Bath and was a vital player during the 2024 season where she ranked third highest for intercepts at just 19 years old. It was announced that Team Bath would not be offered a contract for the 2025 season and the senior team would disband.

=== Nottingham Forest Netball ===
Pechova was signed to Nottingham Forest Netball for their inaugural season in 2025 alongside fellow Team Bath defender Tash Pavelin. She had a standout season and won the Young Player of the Year award. Pechova and Pavelin built a strong defensive partnership, named 'Pavlova'. During the 2026 season Pechova helped Forest secure a top four play off spot for the first time. Pechova was named Player of the Year, Fans' Player of the Year, Young Player of the Year and in the All Star VII for the season.

== International career ==
Pechova represented England at under-19 and under-21 level including winning gold at the 2021 Netball Europe Under-21s Championship and captaining the under-19s team to another gold medal in 2022. She was selected to the senior squad for the Fast5 Netball World Series in 2022 and 2024 and made her official Roses debut at the 2023 Taini Jamison Trophy Series.

Pechova was named in the England Roses programme for the 2024–25 season before being named in the Future Roses Programme for the 2025–26 season. She was selected for 2025 Netball World Youth Cup in Gibraltar where she won a bronze medal. Ahead of the 2026–27 season Pechova was recalled to the England Roses full-time programme and selected into the 2026 Commonwealth Games team.

== Honours ==
=== England ===
- Netball World Youth Cup: Bronze: 2025

== Individual awards ==
=== Netball Super League ===
- Young Player of the Year: 2025, 2026
- Fan's Player of the Year: 2026
- Player of the Year: 2026
- All Star VII: 2026

=== BBC ===
- 2022 BBC Sports Personality of the Year (nominated)

=== Sports Aid ===
- 2022 SportsAid's One-to-Watch Award (nominated)
