= 1998 Southern Sting season =

Southern Sting season

Southern Sting
- 1998 season
- Head coach: Robyn Broughton
- Manager: Jackie Barron
- Captain: Bernice Mene
- Main venue: Centennial Hall

Season results
- Wins–losses: 8–3
- Season placing: 2nd
- Team colours

Southern Sting seasons
- ← 1997 1999 →

The 1998 Southern Sting season saw the Southern Sting netball team compete in the 1998 Coca-Cola Cup league season. 1998 was the inaugural season for the league. Together with Auckland Diamonds, Bay of Plenty Magic, Capital Shakers, Canterbury Flames, Counties Manukau Cometz, Northern Force, Otago Rebels, Waikato Wildcats and Western Flyers, Sting became founding members of the new league. With a team coached by Robyn Broughton, captained by Bernice Mene and featuring Reinga Bloxham, Kirsty Broughton, Julie Carter and Donna Loffhagen, Sting finished the season as grand finalists and runners up. In the grand final they lost to Otago Rebels 57–50.

== Players ==
=== 1998 roster ===
1998 Southern Sting roster
Players
Coaching staff

Nat.	Name	Position(s)	DoB	Height
(New Zealand)	Reinga Bloxham	WD, C	(aged 23)	–
(New Zealand)	Kirsty Broughton	WD, C		–
(New Zealand)	Julie Carter	GA, WA	27 November 1965 (aged 32)	1.76 m (5 ft 9 in)
(New Zealand)	Rachel Donnelly			–
(New Zealand)	Camille Grubb	GS, GA		–
(New Zealand)	Michelle Krynen	GD, GK		–
(New Zealand)	Donna Loffhagen	GS, GA	29 April 1978 (aged 19)	1.85 m (6 ft 1 in)
(New Zealand)	Tasha Marshall	WD, C		–
(New Zealand)	Bernice Mene (c)	GD, GK	18 January 1975 (aged 23)	1.88 m (6 ft 2 in)
(New Zealand)	Debbie Munro	GS, GA		–
(New Zealand)	Nicola Russell			–
(New Zealand)	Jo Tapper			–

Head coach

- (New Zealand) Robyn Broughton

Manager: Jackie Barron
Physiotherapist:
Neil Familton
Marketing & Events Manager:
Liz McDonald
Sponsorship Manager & Office Administrator:
Robyn Koehler

Notes

- (c) – Captain
- (cc) – Co-captain
- (vc) – Vice-captain
- – Injury / maternity leave
- (TRP) – Temporary Replacement Player

== Regular season ==
On Friday, 27 March 1998, Sting made their league debut with a 55–51 win against Auckland Diamonds. The starting lineup featured Donna Loffhagen and Camille Grubb in the shooting circle, Kirsty Broughton, Tasha Marshall and Reinga Bloxham through the mid-court and Bernice Mene and Michelle Krynen in defence. Debbie Munro entered the shooting circle in the third quarter.

=== Fixtures and results ===
Round 1

27 March	Southern Sting	55–51	Auckland Diamonds	Centennial Hall, Invercargill

Round 2

29 March	Canterbury Flames	53–55	Southern Sting	Christchurch

Round 3

3 April	Southern Sting	78–41	Waikato Wildcats	Centennial Hall, Invercargill

Round 4

5 April	Southern Sting	54–61	Otago Rebels	Centennial Hall, Invercargill

Round 5

12 April	Capital Shakers	48–50	Southern Sting	Wellington

Round 6

17 April	Northern Force	39–56	Southern Sting	Glenfield

Round 7

19 April	Counties Manukau Cometz	44–42	Southern Sting	Papatoetoe

Round 8

24 April	Bay of Plenty Magic	43–50	Southern Sting	Rotorua

Round 9

26 April	Southern Sting	68–48	Western Flyers	Centennial Hall, Invercargill

== Finals series ==
=== Semi-final ===
2 May	Southern Sting	59–58	Canterbury Flames	Centennial Hall, Invercargill

=== Grand final ===
Sat, 10 May	Otago Rebels	57–50	Southern Sting	Edgar Centre
Sat, 10 May	Scoring by quarter: 13–12, 34–22, 38–49, 57–50			Edgar Centre
Sat, 10 May	Jo Steed 47/56 (84%); Belinda Colling 10/18 (56%)		Donna Loffhagen 38/51 (75%); Debbie Munro 12/15 (80%)	Edgar Centre
