= New Zealand Constitutional Advisory Panel =

The New Zealand Constitutional Advisory Panel was established in August 2011 by the New Zealand Government. Its aim was to support the consideration of New Zealand constitutional issues by reporting to the Deputy Prime Minister of New Zealand and to the Minister of Māori Affairs on an understanding of New Zealanders' perspectives on New Zealand's constitutional arrangements, topical issues and areas where reform should be undertaken.

== Panel members ==
The twelve constitutional panel members were:

- Peter Chin – former Mayor of Dunedin
- John Burrows
- Tipene O'Regan
- Deborah Coddington
- Michael Cullen
- John Luxton
- Bernice Mene
- Leonie Pihama
- Hinurewa Poutu
- Linda Tuhiwai Smith
- Peter Tennent
- Ranginui Walker
