= Jeremy Campbell-Lamerton =

Scotland international rugby union player

- Born: 21 February 1957 (age 69) Gibraltar
- Height: 6 ft 5 in (1.96 m)
- Weight: 17 st 7 lb (111 kg)

Rugby union career
- Position: Lock
Amateur team(s)
Years	Team	Apps	(Points)
- Durham University
–	London Scottish		
Provincial / State sides
Years	Team	Apps	(Points)
- Anglo-Scots
International career
Years	Team	Apps	(Points)
1985-86	Scotland 'B'	2	
1986-87	Scotland	3	(0)

Jeremy Robert Edward Campbell-Lamerton (born 21 February 1957 in Gibraltar) is a former Scottish national team international rugby union player.

== Army career ==
Campbell-Lamerton served as an officer with the Scots Guards in Germany, in Northern Ireland and through the Falklands War, reaching the rank of Captain before he left the British Army in 1983.

== Rugby Union career ==
=== Amateur career ===
After leaving Downside School Campbell-Lamerton matriculated at Durham University in 1975, where he read for a General Arts degree and competed for the university rugby team. He was 6 ft 5 and a half inches and 17.5 stone and played at lock.

He went on to play for London Scottish.

=== Provincial career ===
He played for the Anglo-Scots District in the Scottish Inter-District Championship. He captained the side in 1986-87 season.

=== International career ===
He won 2 caps for Scotland 'B' in the period 1985-86.

He won 3 caps playing for the Scottish national team in the 1986–7 season.

He made his international debut for Scotland on 18 January 1986 at Murrayfield against France.

He was selected for the Scotland squad for the 1987 Rugby World Cup. He played two matches in the tournament, the last against Romania on 2 June 1987 in Dunedin.

== Family ==
He is the son of Mike Campbell-Lamerton, the noted rugby player. He has one son and three daughters (one of whom, Olivia, played tennis for Great Britain).

== See also ==
- Rugby union in Gibraltar

== Sources ==
- Bath, Richard (ed.) The Complete Book of Rugby (Seven Oaks Ltd, 1997 ISBN 1-86200-013-1)
- Massie, Allan A Portrait of Scottish Rugby (Polygon, Edinburgh; ISBN 0-904919-84-6)
