= ILT Stadium Southland =

Multi-purpose venue in New Zealand

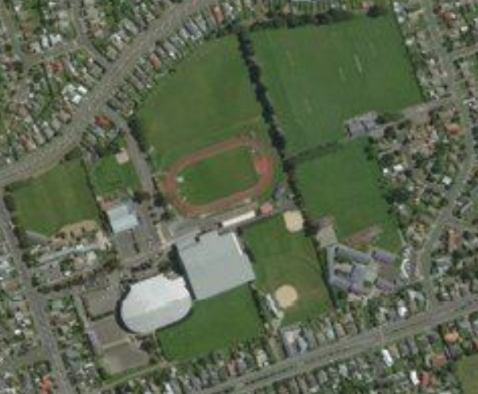
- Interactive map of ILT Stadium Southland
- Former names: Stadium Southland
- Location: Surrey Park Sports Centre; Invercargill; Southland
- Coordinates: 46.4069°S 168.3816°E
- Owner: Southland Indoor Leisure Centre Charitable Trust
- Capacity: 4,019

Construction
- Opened: 2000

Tenants
- Netball: Southern Sting; Southern Steel; Basketball: Southland Sharks; New Zealand Breakers

Website
- www.stadiumsouth.co.nz

ILT Stadium Southland, also called Southland Arena, is an indoor arena and multi-purpose venue located in Surrey Park, Invercargill, Southland, New Zealand. It was originally the home venue of the Southern Sting netball team. It currently serves as the main home venue of both the Southern Steel netball team and Southland Sharks of New Zealand's National Basketball League. It has also occasionally served as a home venue for both the New Zealand national netball team and for New Zealand Breakers of Australia's National Basketball League. The venue is owned by Southland Indoor Leisure Centre Charitable Trust and the Invercargill Licensing Trust has the naming rights. Stadium Southland was originally opened in 2000. Following a roof collapse in 2010, it was redeveloped in 2014. The SIT Zero Fees Velodrome, which was opened in 2006, is adjacent to the main stadium complex. As well as hosting netball and basketball matches and tournaments, Stadium Southland has also hosted music concerts and tennis, badminton, boxing and wrestling events.

== Home teams ==
=== Southern Sting ===
Between 2000 and 2007, Stadium Southland served as the home venue for Southern Sting. Sting played in Netball New Zealand's Coca-Cola Cup/National Bank Cup league. Sting were the league's most successful team. Between 2000 and 2005, they played six successive grand finals at Stadium Southland, winning five titles.

=== Southern Steel ===
Since 2008, Stadium Southland has served as the main home venue for Southern Steel. In 2017, Steel won their first premiership when they were the inaugural ANZ Premiership winners. Steel defeated Central Pulse 69–53 in the grand final which was played at Stadium Southland. On 8 August 2018, for a match against Mainland Tactix, Stadium Southland was temporarily re-named the Wendy Frew Stadium in honour of the retiring Steel captain Wendy Frew.

=== Southland Sharks ===
Since 2010, Stadium Southland has served as the main home venue for Southland Sharks of New Zealand's National Basketball League. In 2021, Sharks played six home matches at Stadium Southland.

=== New Zealand Breakers ===
On 16 November 2018, New Zealand Breakers hosted their first Australian National Basketball League match at Stadium Southland. Breakers took on Melbourne United, losing 108–101. During the 2019–20 NBL regular season, Breakers returned to Stadium Southland. This time they played Perth Wildcats, losing 84–79.

== History ==
=== 2000 Opening ===
Ray Harper, a local sports administrator and Invercargill Licensing Trust president, advocated for the establishment of a home venue for Southern Sting. Harper took on the role of project manager for Stadium Southland and rallied the community to get the venue built in 2000. On 25 March 2000, Stadium Southland was officially opened by Prime Minister Helen Clark. The original stadium featured a seven-court complex and was constructed at a cost of NZ$11.3 million. It had a permanent seating capacity of 2,600 and almost 2000 more in temporary scaffolding. On 2 April 2000, Southern Sting made their home debut at Stadium Southland, with a 65–56 win against Capital Shakers.

=== 2010 roof collapse ===
On 18 September 2010, the Stadium Southland roof collapsed following a heavy snowfall. About 12 youth tennis players and their parents were leaving a training session at about 11:25am when the roof above the courts came down under the weight of fresh snow. In December 2010 a review found that the roof collapse was due to inadequate workmanship, low building code requirements and unusually heavy snow fall. In May 2012, the Department of Building and Housing released a report citing construction defects and deficiencies in steel fabrication and welding as contributing factors to the collapse. The report was also referred to the New Zealand Police to investigate.

In 2015, Stadium Southland's insurers were awarded nearly NZ$17m after stadium engineer Tony Major and Invercargill City Council were found guilty of negligence. The judge found the city council was entitled to seek 90% of the $16,998,225 in damages from Major, who did not ensure roofing repairs 10 years earlier complied with the building code. The city council was found to be 10% liable because it signed off on the work without being sure it was up to scratch. In 2016, the council appealed to the Court of Appeal, with council lawyer, David Heaney QC, arguing the council was not liable because the Southland Indoor Leisure Centre Charitable Trust had been "careless in respect to their own safety". After the roof of the stadium was seen swaying about six inches in the wind, the stadium trust carried out an inspection and was given recommendations that included "an inspection of the welds and trussess", Heaney said. However, those inspections were not carried out. "If those recommendations had been adopted, the roof collapse wouldn't have occurred," he said at the appeal hearing. The Supreme Court decision, handed down by three judges in 2017, supported Heaney's claims.

=== 2014 reopening ===
In February 2014, Stadium Southland, now known as ILT Stadium Southland following a naming rights agreement with Invercargill Licensing Trust, was reopened. On 9 May 2014, Stadium Southland was officially opened by Prime Minister John Key. The redevelopment of the stadium cost NZ$43.5m. This included $6.6m for an enlarged entrance, $3.9m for a larger community court area, $3.2m for a strengthened core block and $2.3m for upgraded seating, sound system, scoreboards, and climbing wall. The new toilets cost $1m. The New Zealand Government contributed $2m to the cost.

=== 2023 Nigel Skelt scandal ===
In April 2023 it was announced that Nigel Skelt had resigned as general manager of Stadium Southland. Skelt had worked at the stadium for 24 years. On 2 May 2023, Radio New Zealand reported that a female teenage employee at Stadium Southland had resigned on 17 February 2023 in response to Skelt's remarks about her physical appearance, naked jelly wrestling, and sexual reproduction. The former employee said she was upset by Skelt's remarks and no longer wanted to work alongside him. Radio New Zealand also reported that the Mayor of Invercargill, Nobby Clark, at the behest of the Stadium Southland Limited chairman, Alan Dennis, tried to defuse the situation. He paid the teenage employee's NZ$3,000 in lost income, offering the employee counseling and work, issuing a warning to Skelt, and negotiatated a confidentiality agreement with the employee. The young woman's parents criticised Clark in a letter for allegedly prioritising Skelt and the stadium's reputation over the hurt and damage experienced by the employee. The incident became public knowledge following a Local Government Official Information Meeting Act media request filed on 29 March 2023. On 4 May 2023, Skelt resigned as an Invercargill city councillor after a fellow councillor, Ria Bond, threatened to resign if Skelt did not. Clark subsequently resigned from the Southland Indoor Leisure Centre Charitable Trust and Dennis resigned from the Stadium Southland Limited board.

== Netball finals ==
During the Coca-Cola Cup/National Bank Cup, the ANZ Championship and the ANZ Premiership eras, Stadium Southland has hosted several netball finals.

=== Coca-Cola Cup ===
Season	Winners	Score	Runners up
2000	Southern Sting	43–40	Canterbury Flames
2001	Southern Sting	47–44	Canterbury Flames

=== National Bank Cup ===
Season	Winners	Score	Runners up
2002	Southern Sting	54–48	Canterbury Flames
2003	Southern Sting	51–49	Northern Force
2004	Southern Sting	63–55	Canterbury Flames
2005	Waikato Bay of Plenty Magic	65–39	Southern Sting

=== ANZ Championship ===
Season	Winners	Score	Runners up
2016	Southern Steel	57–59	Waikato Bay of Plenty Magic

=== ANZ Premiership ===
Season	Winners	Score	Runners up
2017	Southern Steel	69–53	Central Pulse
2020	Central Pulse	43–31	Mainland Tactix

== Events hosted ==
As well as hosting netball and basketball matches and tournaments, Stadium Southland has also hosted music concerts and tennis, badminton, boxing and wrestling events.

Date	Event	
6–8 April 2001	2001 Davis Cup	International tennis match between New Zealand and Uzbekistan
25 April 2007	Hi-5 live performances	
27 September 2008	Hi-5 live performances	
24–27 February 2010	2010 Oceania Badminton Championships	International badminton tournament
2 October 2014	2014 Constellation Cup	International netball test between New Zealand and Australia
1 August 2015	Joseph Parker - Road to the Title	Heaveyweight boxing fight between Joseph Parker and Bowie Tupou. The undercard featured David Letele, Jai Opetaia, Izu Ugonoh, Bowyn Morgan and Jeff Horn.
20 October 2016	2016 Constellation Cup	International netball test between New Zealand and Australia
3 September 2017	2017 Netball Quad Series	International netball series featuring New Zealand, Australia, England and South Africa.
14 July 2018	2018 Southern Rumble	Southern Pro Wrestling event
16 November 2018	New Zealand Breakers v Melbourne United	Breakers host their first Australian National Basketball League match at Stadium Southland.
13 July 2019	2019 Southern Rumble	Southern Pro Wrestling event
3 November 2019	New Zealand Breakers v Perth Wildcats	Breakers host Wildcats in a 2019–20 NBL regular season Round 5 match.
7–8 August 2020	Southern Steel Double Header Weekend.	Southern Steel play Northern Mystics and Central Pulse in the 2020 ANZ Premiership
3 October 2020	Blindspott concert.	
24 June 2021	Devilskin and Kora concerts.	
19 October 2023	2023 Constellation Cup	International netball test between New Zealand and Australia. The stadium was temporarily renamed Robyn Broughton Stadium in honour of the former coach, Robyn Broughton who had died on 6 September 2023.
6 October 2024	2024 Taini Jamison Trophy Series	International netball test between New Zealand and England.
