= 1999 Southern Sting season =

Southern Sting season

Southern Sting
- 1999 season
- Head coach: Robyn Broughton
- Manager: Jackie Barron
- Captain: Bernice Mene
- Main venue: Centennial Hall

Season results
- Wins–losses: 8–2
- Season placing: 1st
- Team colours

Southern Sting seasons
- ← 1998 2000 →

The 1999 Southern Sting season saw the Southern Sting netball team compete in the 1999 Coca-Cola Cup league season. With a team coached by Robyn Broughton, captained by Bernice Mene and featuring Reinga Bloxham, Kirsty Broughton, Julie Carter and Donna Loffhagen, Sting won their first Coca-Cola Cup title. In the grand final, they defeated Otago Rebels 63–54.

== Players ==
=== Player movements ===
Gains and losses
▲ Gains	▼ Losses
Sharalyn Cumming; Kate Newson (Northern Force); Maria O'Neill; Naomi Siddall	Rachel Donnelly; Camille Grubb; Michelle Krynen; Tasha Marshall

=== 1999 roster ===
1999 Southern Sting roster
Players
Coaching staff

Nat.	Name	Position(s)	DoB	Height
(New Zealand)	Reinga Bloxham	WD, C	(aged 24)	–
(New Zealand)	Kirsty Broughton	WD, C		–
(New Zealand)	Julie Carter	GA,WA	27 November 1965 (aged 33)	1.76 m (5 ft 9 in)
(New Zealand)	Sharalyn Cumming			–
(New Zealand)	Donna Loffhagen	GS, GA	29 April 1978 (aged 20)	1.85 m (6 ft 1 in)
(New Zealand)	Bernice Mene (c)	GD, GK	18 January 1975 (aged 24)	1.88 m (6 ft 2 in)
(New Zealand)	Debbie Munro	GS, GA		–
(New Zealand)	Kate Newson			–
(New Zealand)	Maria O'Neill			–
(New Zealand)	Nicola Russell			–
(England)	Naomi Siddall	GD, GK	2 April 1975 (aged 23)	1.82 m (6 ft 0 in)
(New Zealand)	Jo Tapper			–

Head coach

- (New Zealand) Robyn Broughton

Manager: Jackie Barron
Physiotherapist:
Neil Familton
Sports Science:
Steve Jackson
Marketing & Events Manager:
Liz McDonald
Sponsorship Manager & Office Administrator:
Robyn Koehler

Notes

- (c) – Captain
- (cc) – Co-captain
- (vc) – Vice-captain
- – Injury / maternity leave
- (TRP) – Temporary Replacement Player

== Regular season ==
=== Fixtures and results ===
Round 1

19 March	Southern Sting	40–38	Northern Force	Centennial Hall, Invercargill

Round 2

21 March	Western Flyers	52–38	Southern Sting	Palmerston North

Round 3

26 March	Waikato Bay of Plenty Magic	46–56	Southern Sting	Tauranga
			Donna Loffhagen 39/47 (83%)

Round 4

28 March	Auckland Diamonds	50–48	Southern Sting	ASB Stadium

Round 5

1 April	Otago Rebels	53–59	Southern Sting	Edgar Centre

Round 6

Southern Sting received a bye.

Round 7

11 April	Southern Sting	67–52	Counties Manukau Cometz	Centennial Hall, Invercargill

Round 8

16 April	Southern Sting	66–46	Canterbury Flames	Centennial Hall, Invercargill

Round 9

18 April	Southern Sting	56–47	Capital Shakers	Centennial Hall, Invercargill

== Finals series ==
=== Semi-final ===
23 April	Southern Sting	64–41	Northern Force	Centennial Hall, Invercargill

=== Grand final ===
30 April	Otago Rebels	54–63	Southern Sting	Edgar Centre
30 April	Scoring by quarter: 16–18, 31–33, ?–?, 54–63			Edgar Centre
30 April	Jo Steed; Belinda Colling		Donna Loffhagen 36/44 (82%); Julie Carter	Edgar Centre
