= 2000 Southern Sting season =

Southern Sting season

Southern Sting
- 2000 season
- Head coach: Robyn Broughton
- Manager: Jackie Barron
- Captain: Bernice Mene
- Main venue: Stadium Southland

Season results
- Wins–losses: 10–0
- Season placing: 1st
- Team colours

Southern Sting seasons
- ← 1999 2001 →

The 2000 Southern Sting season saw the Southern Sting netball team compete in the 2000 Coca-Cola Cup league season. With a team coached by Robyn Broughton, captained by Bernice Mene and featuring Kirsty Broughton, Julie Carter, Donna Loffhagen and Lesley Nicol, Sting won their second Coca-Cola Cup title. Sting began the season with a 65–56 win against Capital Shakers, making their league debut at a new home venue, Stadium Southland, in front of 3000 fans. Sting subsequently went through the season unbeaten, winning all ten of their matches. In the grand final, they defeated Canterbury Flames 43–40.

== Players ==
=== Player movements ===
Gains and losses
▲ Gains	▼ Losses
Rachel Gill; Michelle Krynen; Lesley Nicol (Otago Rebels); Janine Topia; Bulou Rabuka	Reinga Bloxham (pregnancy); Sharalyn Cumming; Debbie Munro; Nicola Russell; Naomi Siddall

=== 2000 roster ===
2000 Southern Sting roster
Players
Coaching staff

Nat.	Name	Position(s)	DoB	Height
(New Zealand)	Kirsty Broughton	WD, C		–
(New Zealand)	Julie Carter	GA, WA	27 November 1965 (aged 34)	1.76 m (5 ft 9 in)
(New Zealand)	Rachel Gill			–
(New Zealand)	Michelle Krynen	GD, GK		–
(New Zealand)	Donna Loffhagen	GS, GA	29 April 1978 (aged 21)	1.85 m (6 ft 1 in)
(New Zealand)	Bernice Mene (c)	GD, GK	18 January 1975 (aged 25)	1.88 m (6 ft 2 in)
(New Zealand)	Kate Newson			–
(New Zealand)	Lesley Nicol	WD, C	9 May 1973 (aged 26)	1.78 m (5 ft 10 in)
(New Zealand)	Maria O'Neill			–
(Fiji)	Bulou Rabuka			–
(New Zealand)	Jo Tapper			–
(New Zealand)	Janine Topia			–

Head coach

- (New Zealand) Robyn Broughton

Manager: Jackie Barron
Physiotherapist:
Neil Familton
Sports Science:
Steve Jackson
Marketing & Events Manager:
Liz McDonald
Sponsorship Manager & Office Administrator:
Robyn Koehler

Notes

- (c) – Captain
- (cc) – Co-captain
- (vc) – Vice-captain
- – Injury / maternity leave
- (TRP) – Temporary Replacement Player

== Regular season ==
=== Fixtures and results ===
Round 1

2 April	Southern Sting	65–56	Capital Shakers	Stadium Southland
				Attendance: 3,000

Round 2

8 April	Southern Sting	52–42	Canterbury Flames	Stadium Southland

Round 3

14 April	Counties Manukau Cometz	46–67	Southern Sting	Papatoetoe

Round 4

16 April	Waikato Bay of Plenty Magic	39–67	Southern Sting	Mystery Creek Events Centre
		Report

Round 5

28 April	Southern Sting	59–58	Auckland Diamonds	Stadium Southland

Round 6

Southern Sting received a bye.

Round 7

7 May	Otago Rebels	44–63	Southern Sting	Edgar Centre

Round 8

13 May	Southern Sting	66–48	Western Flyers	Stadium Southland

Round 9

21 May	Northern Force	46–64	Southern Sting	Takapuna

== Finals series ==
=== Semi-final ===
26 May	Report	Southern Sting	48–44	Northern Force	Stadium Southland

=== Grand final ===
3 June	Southern Sting	43–40	Canterbury Flames	Stadium Southland; Attendance: 3,300
3 June	Scoring by quarter: 9–5, 21–18, 33–30, 43–40			Stadium Southland; Attendance: 3,300
