= Gibraltar Barbarians Rugby Club =

- Full name: Gibraltar Barbarians Rugby Club / Campo Gibraltar Rugby Club
- Union: Gibraltar Rugby Football Union (GRFU) / FAR
- Nickname: Barbarians
- Founded: 1945
- Region: Cádiz, Spain
- Ground: Pueblo Nuevo de Guadiaro (Capacity: 100)
- President: Jack Milton
- League: Iberian League / FAR
- 2011-2012: 1st
Team kit

The Gibraltar Barbarians Rugby Football Club (GRFC) is a rugby union club from Gibraltar and the surrounding Campo in Spain, who play in the Andalucian League as Gibraltar Barbarians RFC. They used to play their home games in the town of Guadiaro near Sotogrande in the Cadiz province of Spain. They have now re-domiciled to La Linea, on the border with Gibraltar. They currently play in the Iberian Rugby League.

== History ==
Gibraltar Rugby Football Club was established immediately after the Second World War. After the repatriation of displaced Gibraltarians locals who had learnt to play rugby either at English schools or whilst being in the forces started to play the resident teams from the Army, Navy and RAF in a pitch in neighbouring Spain (given the lack of grass pitches in Gibraltar). Initially the military sides were dominant but by the 1960s the Latin flair which became a trade mark of Gibraltar's style of rugby became evident and GRFC became the dominant force in the area. A local league consisting of GRFC, Army, Navy and RAF was set up in the mid-1960s which added a more structured and competitive framework within which to play.

The closure of the land frontier between Gibraltar and Spain in 1968 saw local rugby diminish in popularity but tag Rugby ensured that it did not entirely disappear. In 1985 the land frontier re-opened and with it the local league once again became an important part of Gibraltar's weekly sporting calendar with games being played in Spain on grass pitches mostly located within 15 minutes of Gibraltar. GRFC prospered within the local league and since 1985 with the exception of three years when the Duke of Wellington Regiment were posted to Gibraltar the GRFC won the league year after year. Games against Spanish sides during the 1980s were played on a friendly basis primarily against sides from Seville and Madrid. Spanish rugby grew in popularity and by 1990 the GRFC began to struggle against premier league sides but enjoyed very competitive games against First Division regional teams in Andalusia.

The reduction in military personnel in 1991/1992 and the positive approach by the Andalusian Rugby Federation that uniquely kept politics out of sport meant that it became clear that the GFRC future was playing within the Andalusian League and the 1992/93 season saw GRFC fully integrated into the Second Division of Andalusia. Players from forces sides joined the GRFC and by 1994 the GFRC were at their strongest historically. In that same year the GRFC were promoted to the First Division almost winning it in the first year. Throughout this period the GRFC toured regularly entering tournaments in Spain and Portugal with considerable success both at 15s and 7s. The highlight was winning the Benidorm 7s tournament Club section in 1996. Ireland won the national section.

By 2000, the retirement of a crop of players at the same time led to GRFC dropping to the Second Division where they stayed until 2004/05 when they were once again promoted. In their first year in the First Division they finished third but the failure to produce a youth side meant that they were relegated to the Second Division.

Season	Tier	League	Place
1992-93	4	Andalusian 2nd División	1st Gr. South
1993-94	4	Andalusian 2nd División	1st Gr. South
1994-95	4	Andalusian 2nd División	unknown
1995-96	4	Andalusian 2nd División	1st Gr. South (promoted)
1996-97	3	Andalusian League	2nd Gr. A
1997-98	3	Andalusian League	2nd Gr. A
1998-99	3	Andalusian League	4th Gr. A (relegated)
1999-2000	5 (Note: 1ra Nacional (tier 3) was created between Div. Honor B (tier 2) and regional leagues became tier 4.)	Andalusian 2nd División	4th Gr. B
2000-01	5	Andalusian 2nd División	3rd Gr. Est
2001-02	Didn't participated		
2002-03	5	Andalusian 2nd División	2nd Gr. West
2003-04	5	Andalusian 2nd División	2nd
2004-05	5	Andalusian 2nd División	1st (promoted)
2005-06	4	Andalusian League	4th (relegated) (Note: GBRC wes relegated at the end of the season cause they didn't accomplish the requirement of having a young team.)
2006-07	5	Andalusian 2nd División	1st (promoted)

Season	Tier	League	Place
2007-08	4	Andalusian League	3rd
2008-09	4	Andalusian League	3rd
2009-10	4	Andalusian League	unknown
2010-11	4	Andalusian League	3rd
2011-12	4	Andalusian League	1st
2012-13	3 (Note: 1ra Nacional (tier 3) was eliminated between Div. Honor B (tier 2) and regional leagues became tier 3.)	Andalusian League	1st
2013-14	3	Andalusian League	2nd
2014-15	3	Andalusian League	unknown
2015-16	3	Andalusian League	unknown
2016-17	3	Andalusian League	unknown
2017-18	Only young teams		
2018-19	Only young teams		
2019-20	Only young teams		
2020-21	on goin		

== Promotion into the First Division ==
During the 2006–2007 season the club played in Group A of the Andalucian Regional League 2, they finished top of the league winning 7 out of 8 games in the process and then went on to beat local rivals Marbella 3–0 in a playoff final on 15 April for promotion back to Regional League 1. The GRFC organised a youth section of the club to ensure they gained their rightful place in the First Division.

Team	Games played	Games won	Games drawn	Games lost	Points For	Points Against	Points
Campo Gibraltar	8	7	0	1	207	66	14
CR Atletico Portuense	8	6	0	2	305	92	12
Marbella RC	8	3	1	4	101	129	7
CR Malaga	8	2	1	5	95	263	5
CR Ciudad San Roque 89	8	1	0	7	51	209	0

== Rugby in the Primera Division Regional ==
Since their promotion into the First Division, Gibraltar have been one of the most consistent teams in their league, maintaining a position in the top half of the table. They finished third behind Malaga and San Jeronimo in the 2009/2010 season.

== Youth Rugby ==
To maintain their position within the First Division in Andalucia, the GBRFC organised an Under 19s team to be entered into the league. The team was known as the GRFC Colts. The Andalucian Rugby Federation changed the age groups for the 2010/2011 season meaning that the Under 19s would become Under 20s. The GBRFC entered both an Under 18s and 20s team into the Andalucian leagues. The Under 18s would be known as the Gibraltar CG Ice Barbarians and the Under 20s would be known as the Gibraltar CepsaGib Barbarians.

== 2013/2014 season ==
The Barbarians kicked off the 2013/2014 season with a 53–18 home win over long-standing rivals, San Jeronimo of Seville.

== See also ==
- Rugby union in Gibraltar
- Sport in Gibraltar
