= Netball World Youth Cup =

International netball competition for under-21 teams

- Most recent season or competition: 2025 Netball World Youth Cup
- Sport: Netball
- Founded: 1988
- First season: 1988
- Organising body: World Netball
- Most recent champion: Australia
- Most titles: Australia (5 titles)
- Broadcaster: YouTube
- Website: Netball World Youth Cup

The Netball World Youth Cup, previously known as the World Youth Netball Championships, is an international netball competition featuring under-21 teams. It is organised by World Netball. The inaugural 1988 tournament was hosted by Australia as part of the Australian Bicentenary celebrations. Australia and New Zealand have dominated the competition, winning every tournament between them.

== Tournaments ==
=== 3rd/4th play-off ===
Tournament	Third	Score	Fourth	Venue
1988	New Zealand	64–39	Canada	Canberra, Australia
1992	Cook Islands	42–39	England	Suva, Fiji
1996	England		West Samoa	Toronto, Canada
2000	New Zealand	63–47	England	Cardiff International Arena
2005	Australia	61–44	Jamaica	Fort Lauderdale, United States
2009	England	48–42	Jamaica	Rarotonga, Cook Islands
2013	Jamaica	52–33	England	Emirates Arena
2017	England	70–35	Fiji	University of Botswana
2025	England	55–35	South Africa	Europa Sports Park

=== Finals ===
Tournament	Winners	Score	Runners Up	Venue
1988	Australia	75–23	England	Canberra, Australia
1992	New Zealand	44–40	Australia	Suva, Fiji
1996	Australia	62–58	New Zealand	Toronto, Canada
2000	Australia	58–47	Jamaica	Cardiff International Arena
2005	New Zealand	53–39	England	Fort Lauderdale, United States
2009	Australia	64–46	New Zealand	Rarotonga, Cook Islands
2013	New Zealand	52–47	Australia	Emirates Arena
2017	New Zealand	60–57	Australia	University of Botswana
2025	Australia	63–48	New Zealand	Europa Sports Park
