= 2018–19 NBL regular season =

The regular season of the 2018–19 NBL season, the 41st season of the National Basketball League (NBL). It started on 11 October 2018 and finished on 17 February 2019. Eight teams participated, with the top four advancing to the finals series.

== Games ==
=== Round 1 ===
11 October 2018	New Zealand Breakers	73–86	Brisbane Bullets	Spark Arena, Auckland
19:20	Scoring by quarter: 21–14, 17–21, 17–24, 18–27
Sky Sport		boxscore		Attendance: 5,157

11 October 2018	Adelaide 36ers	91–99	Perth Wildcats	Titanium Security Arena, Adelaide
19:20	Scoring by quarter: 23–23, 18–25, 32–26, 18–25
Fox Sports		boxscore		Attendance: 5,836

12 October 2018	Illawarra Hawks	122–123(4OT)	Melbourne United	WIN Entertainment Centre, Wollongong
19:50	Scoring by quarter: 23–19, 23–23, 20–27, 22–19, Overtime: 13–13, 7–7, 8–8, 6–7
Fox Sports		boxscore		Attendance: 2,688

13 October 2018	Sydney Kings	83–94	Adelaide 36ers	Qudos Bank Arena, Sydney
14:50	Scoring by quarter: 19–21, 24–23, 25–21, 15–29
Fox Sports		boxscore		Attendance: 10,761

13 October 2018	Brisbane Bullets	70–88	Cairns Taipans	Brisbane Convention Centre, Brisbane
18:50	Scoring by quarter: 18–19, 19–21, 17–20, 16–28
Fox Sports		boxscore		Attendance: 3,196

14 October 2018	Melbourne United	81–88	New Zealand Breakers	Melbourne Arena, Melbourne
14:50	Scoring by quarter: 28–19, 14–28, 24–24, 15–17
Fox Sports		boxscore		Attendance: 8,329

14 October 2018	Perth Wildcats	101–61	Illawarra Hawks	RAC Arena, Perth
14:20	Scoring by quarter: 28–16, 28–18, 17–10, 28–17
Fox Sports		boxscore		Attendance: 12,853

=== Round 2 ===
19 October 2018	Adelaide 36ers	106–101	Sydney Kings	Titanium Security Arena, Adelaide
19:20	Scoring by quarter: 29–26, 33–26, 20–28, 24–21
Fox Sports		boxscore		Attendance: 6,625

20 October 2018	Perth Wildcats	88–73	Brisbane Bullets	RAC Arena, Perth
12:00	Scoring by quarter: 28–19, 19–13, 20–18, 21–23
Fox Sports		boxscore		Attendance: 11,599

21 October 2018	New Zealand Breakers	78–101	Sydney Kings	Spark Arena, Auckland
14:20	Scoring by quarter: 18–29, 22–19, 18–22, 20–31
Sky Sport		boxscore		Attendance: 5,652

21 October 2018	Melbourne United	75–72	Adelaide 36ers	Melbourne Arena, Melbourne
14:50	Scoring by quarter: 15–19, 29–25, 17–15, 14–13
Fox Sports		boxscore		Attendance: 7,764

21 October 2018	Cairns Taipans	93–104	Illawarra Hawks	Cairns Convention Centre, Cairns
16:20	Scoring by quarter: 28–27, 20–20, 16–21, 29–36
Fox Sports		boxscore		Attendance: 5,001

=== Round 3 ===
25 October 2018	Brisbane Bullets	100–96	Perth Wildcats	Brisbane Convention Centre, Brisbane
18:50	Scoring by quarter: 34–26, 23–26, 21–17, 22–27
Fox Sports		boxscore		Attendance: 2,000 (approx.)

26 October 2018	Cairns Taipans	83–91	Adelaide 36ers	Cairns Convention Centre, Cairns
18:50	Scoring by quarter: 20–12, 12–26, 30–24, 21–29
Fox Sports		boxscore		Attendance: 4,138

27 October 2018	Perth Wildcats	101–96(2OT)	Melbourne United	RAC Arena, Perth
12:00	Scoring by quarter: 20–22, 21–20, 25–26, 18–16, Overtime: 4–4, 12–7
Fox Sports		boxscore		Attendance: 11,675

27 October 2018	Illawarra Hawks	86–78	Brisbane Bullets	WIN Entertainment Centre, Wollongong
19:50	Scoring by quarter: 22–30, 29–12, 19–16, 16–20
Fox Sports		boxscore		Attendance: 2,340

28 October 2018	New Zealand Breakers	114–94	Adelaide 36ers	Spark Arena, Auckland
14:20	Scoring by quarter: 31–37, 24–23, 32–26, 27–8
Sky Sport		boxscore		Attendance: 4,513

28 October 2018	Sydney Kings	98–90(OT)	Cairns Taipans	Qudos Bank Arena, Sydney
14:50	Scoring by quarter: 18–20, 23–18, 18–23, 25–23, Overtime: 14–6
Fox Sports		boxscore		Attendance: 7,818

29 October 2018	Melbourne United	99–93	Illawarra Hawks	Melbourne Arena, Melbourne
19:50	Scoring by quarter: 29–16, 27–23, 26–33, 17–21
Fox Sports		boxscore		Attendance: 6,478

=== Round 4 ===
1 November 2018	Brisbane Bullets	108–98	Adelaide 36ers	Brisbane Convention Centre, Brisbane
18:50	Scoring by quarter: 29–32, 31–29, 19–16, 29–21
Fox Sports		boxscore		Attendance: 2,200

2 November 2018	Sydney Kings	86–79	Illawarra Hawks	Qudos Bank Arena, Sydney
19:50	Scoring by quarter: 27–12, 25–23, 21–23, 13–21
Fox Sports		boxscore		Attendance: 7,206

3 November 2018	Perth Wildcats	92–78	New Zealand Breakers	RAC Arena, Perth
12:00	Scoring by quarter: 27–26, 22–21, 23–24, 20–7
Fox Sports		boxscore		Attendance: 11,570

3 November 2018	Cairns Taipans	85–98	Melbourne United	Cairns Convention Centre, Cairns
18:50	Scoring by quarter: 19–29, 21–22, 21–15, 24–32
Fox Sports		boxscore		Attendance: not available

4 November 2018	Adelaide 36ers	90–93	Brisbane Bullets	Titanium Security Arena, Adelaide
14:20	Scoring by quarter: 31–24, 24–26, 18–23, 17–20
Fox Sports		boxscore		Attendance: 5,636

5 November 2018	Melbourne United	77–70	Sydney Kings	Melbourne Arena, Melbourne
19:50	Scoring by quarter: 17–11, 18–18, 18–18, 24–23
Fox Sports		boxscore		Attendance: 10,300

=== Round 5 ===
8 November 2018	Illawarra Hawks	87–81	Melbourne United	WIN Entertainment Centre, Wollongong
19:50	Scoring by quarter: 25–20, 26–22, 21–17, 15–22
Fox Sports		boxscore		Attendance: 2,000

9 November 2018	New Zealand Breakers	104–81	Cairns Taipans	Spark Arena, Auckland
19:50	Scoring by quarter: 30–21, 27–24, 25–12, 22–24
Sky Sport		boxscore		Attendance: 4,463

9 November 2018	Perth Wildcats	90–87	Brisbane Bullets	RAC Arena, Perth
18:50	Scoring by quarter: 25–21, 13–16, 21–24, 31–26
Fox Sports		boxscore		Attendance: 13,132

10 November 2018	Adelaide 36ers	81–93	Sydney Kings	Titanium Security Arena, Adelaide
14:20	Scoring by quarter: 15–27, 28–25, 20–21, 18–20
Fox Sports		boxscore		Attendance: not available

11 November 2018	Melbourne United	87–80	Cairns Taipans	Melbourne Arena, Melbourne
14:50	Scoring by quarter: 17–18, 26–28, 19–21, 25–13
Fox Sports		boxscore		Attendance: 7,897

11 November 2018	Illawarra Hawks	81–90	Perth Wildcats	WIN Entertainment Centre, Wollongong
17:20	Scoring by quarter: 21–36, 21–18, 17–17, 22–19
Fox Sports		boxscore		Attendance: 2,441

11 November 2018	Brisbane Bullets	84–85	New Zealand Breakers	Brisbane Convention Centre, Brisbane
18:50	Scoring by quarter: 21–28, 18–26, 23–9, 22–22
Fox Sports		boxscore		Attendance: 3,170

=== Round 6 ===
16 November 2018	New Zealand Breakers	101–108	Melbourne United	ILT Stadium, Invercargill
19:50	Scoring by quarter: 24–31, 34–20, 21–30, 22–27
Sky Sport		boxscore		Attendance: 2,676

17 November 2018	Adelaide 36ers	104–79	Illawarra Hawks	Titanium Security Arena, Adelaide
14:20	Scoring by quarter: 21–30, 27–16, 31–16, 25–17
Fox Sports		boxscore		Attendance: 5,000

17 November 2018	Cairns Taipans	83–88(OT)	Perth Wildcats	Cairns Convention Centre, Cairns
18:50	Scoring by quarter: 21–14, 18–22, 14–17, 22–22, Overtime: 8–13
Fox Sports		boxscore		Attendance: 4,361

18 November 2018	Melbourne United	102–94	Brisbane Bullets	Melbourne Arena, Melbourne
14:50	Scoring by quarter: 25–20, 18–24, 34–31, 25–19
Fox Sports		boxscore		Attendance: 7,656

18 November 2018	Sydney Kings	100–87	New Zealand Breakers	Qudos Bank Arena, Sydney
17:20	Scoring by quarter: 24–21, 28–18, 27–25, 21–23
Fox Sports		boxscore		Attendance: 8,556

=== Round 7 ===
22 November 2018	Brisbane Bullets	104–85	Illawarra Hawks	Brisbane Convention Centre, Brisbane
18:50	Scoring by quarter: 35–24, 20–29, 24–13, 25–19
Fox Sports		boxscore		Attendance: 2,390

23 November 2018	New Zealand Breakers	93–98(OT)	Perth Wildcats	Spark Arena, Auckland
19:20	Scoring by quarter: 26–21, 14–26, 20–23, 24–14, Overtime: 9–14
Sky Sport		boxscore		Attendance: 4,648

23 November 2018	Adelaide 36ers	109–95	Cairns Taipans	Titanium Security Arena, Adelaide
19:20	Scoring by quarter: 23–29, 31–20, 32–23, 23–23
Fox Sports		boxscore		Attendance: not available

24 November 2018	Melbourne United	84–82	Sydney Kings	Melbourne Arena, Melbourne
14:50	Scoring by quarter: 24–25, 23–19, 20–14, 17–24
Fox Sports		boxscore		Attendance: 10,300

25 November 2018	Illawarra Hawks	120–109	Adelaide 36ers	WIN Entertainment Centre, Wollongong
14:50	Scoring by quarter: 25–32, 40–21, 20–22, 35–34
Fox Sports		boxscore		Attendance: 2,473

25 November 2018	Perth Wildcats	91–86	New Zealand Breakers	RAC Arena, Perth
14:20	Scoring by quarter: 14–24, 21–24, 24–20, 32–18
Fox Sports		boxscore		Attendance: 13,490

=== Round 8 ===
6 December 2018	Sydney Kings	77–72	Perth Wildcats	Qudos Bank Arena, Sydney
19:50	Scoring by quarter: 20–20, 23–13, 15–16, 19–23
Fox Sports		boxscore		Attendance: 6,884

7 December 2018	Cairns Taipans	84–95	Illawarra Hawks	Cairns Convention Centre, Cairns
18:50	Scoring by quarter: 15–20, 26–29, 23–22, 20–24
Fox Sports		boxscore		Attendance: 4,365

8 December 2018	Brisbane Bullets	97–94	Melbourne United	Brisbane Convention Centre, Brisbane
13:50	Scoring by quarter: 18–28, 30–23, 21–29, 28–14
Fox Sports		boxscore		Attendance: 3,304

9 December 2018	New Zealand Breakers	70–71	Sydney Kings	Spark Arena, Auckland
14:20	Scoring by quarter: 23–20, 12–15, 6–21, 29–15
Sky Sport		boxscore		Attendance: 4,789

9 December 2018	Adelaide 36ers	86–87	Illawarra Hawks	Titanium Security Arena, Adelaide
14:20	Scoring by quarter: 25–26, 29–22, 20–19, 12–20
Fox Sports		boxscore		Attendance: 6,000 (approx.)

9 December 2018	Perth Wildcats	94–72	Cairns Taipans	RAC Arena, Perth
14:20	Scoring by quarter: 31–17, 21–21, 19–20, 23–14
Fox Sports		boxscore		Attendance: 12,910

10 December 2018	Melbourne United	74–90	Brisbane Bullets	Melbourne Arena, Melbourne
19:50	Scoring by quarter: 24–17, 23–25, 8–15, 19–33
Fox Sports		boxscore		Attendance: 7,083

=== Round 9 ===
14 December 2018	Perth Wildcats	97–98	Sydney Kings	RAC Arena, Perth
18:50	Scoring by quarter: 28–26, 27–22, 23–21, 19–29
Fox Sports		boxscore		Attendance: 13,348

15 December 2018	Brisbane Bullets	91–101	Adelaide 36ers	Brisbane Convention Centre, Brisbane
13:50	Scoring by quarter: 22–28, 30–24, 18–18, 21–31
Fox Sports		boxscore		Attendance: 3,189

16 December 2018	Illawarra Hawks	68–83	Sydney Kings	WIN Entertainment Centre, Wollongong
14:50	Scoring by quarter: 17–18, 16–18, 21–26, 14–21
Fox Sports		boxscore		Attendance: 3,951

16 December 2018	Cairns Taipans	78–89	New Zealand Breakers	Cairns Convention Centre, Cairns
16:20	Scoring by quarter: 20–19, 19–26, 26–17, 13–27
Fox Sports		boxscore		Attendance: 4,135

17 December 2018	Melbourne United	82–65	Perth Wildcats	Melbourne Arena, Melbourne
19:50	Scoring by quarter: 23–16, 15–21, 23–6, 21–22
Fox Sports		boxscore		Attendance: 7,765

=== Round 10 ===
20 December 2018	Cairns Taipans	70–81	Sydney Kings	Cairns Convention Centre, Cairns
18:50	Scoring by quarter: 20–15, 14–30, 15–15, 21–21
Fox Sports		boxscore		Attendance: 4,038

21 December 2018	New Zealand Breakers	96–79	Illawarra Hawks	Claudelands Arena, Hamilton
19:20	Scoring by quarter: 22–10, 24–22, 24–24, 26–23
Sky Sport		boxscore		Attendance: 3,100

21 December 2018	Brisbane Bullets	93–86	Perth Wildcats	Brisbane Convention Centre, Brisbane
18:50	Scoring by quarter: 18–22, 24–26, 24–19, 27–19
Fox Sports		boxscore		Attendance: 3,080

22 December 2018	Adelaide 36ers	87–82	Cairns Taipans	Titanium Security Arena, Adelaide
14:20	Scoring by quarter: 21–26, 24–16, 17–16, 25–24
Fox Sports		boxscore		Attendance: not available

23 December 2018	Sydney Kings	70–75	Melbourne United	Qudos Bank Arena, Sydney
14:50	Scoring by quarter: 25–26, 22–14, 13–16, 10–19
Fox Sports		boxscore		Attendance: 12,050

23 December 2018	Illawarra Hawks	81–77	Perth Wildcats	WIN Entertainment Centre, Wollongong
17:20	Scoring by quarter: 18–28, 20–22, 28–18, 15–9
Fox Sports		boxscore		Attendance: 2,639

=== Round 11 ===
26 December 2018	Melbourne United	101–103	Adelaide 36ers	Melbourne Arena, Melbourne
19:50	Scoring by quarter: 22–30, 31–26, 29–19, 19–28
Fox Sports		boxscore		Attendance: 10,300

29 December 2018	Sydney Kings	75–68	Brisbane Bullets	Qudos Bank Arena, Sydney
14:50	Scoring by quarter: 24–18, 21–17, 17–19, 13–14
Fox Sports		boxscore		Attendance: 9,545

30 December 2018	Adelaide 36ers	109–98	New Zealand Breakers	Titanium Security Arena, Adelaide
14:20	Scoring by quarter: 26–29, 28–19, 26–23, 29–27
Fox Sports		boxscore		Attendance: 6,500 (approx.)

31 December 2018	Illawarra Hawks	74–100	Brisbane Bullets	WIN Entertainment Centre, Wollongong
17:20	Scoring by quarter: 16–23, 14–28, 15–24, 29–25
Fox Sports		boxscore		Attendance: 3,280

31 December 2018	Cairns Taipans	78–93	Perth Wildcats	Cairns Convention Centre, Cairns
18:50	Scoring by quarter: 21–24, 18–23, 17–21, 22–25
Fox Sports		boxscore		Attendance: 4,554

=== Round 12 ===
3 January 2019	Cairns Taipans	109–80	Brisbane Bullets	Cairns Convention Centre, Cairns
18:50	Scoring by quarter: 24–18, 28–25, 37–17, 20–20
Fox Sports		boxscore		Attendance: 4,011

4 January 2019	Adelaide 36ers	96–104	New Zealand Breakers	Titanium Security Arena, Adelaide
19:20	Scoring by quarter: 27–26, 22–15, 18–29, 29–34
Fox Sports		boxscore		Attendance: not available

5 January 2019	Illawarra Hawks	78–71	Sydney Kings	WIN Entertainment Centre, Wollongong
14:50	Scoring by quarter: 17–15, 19–11, 24–26, 18–19
Fox Sports		boxscore		Attendance: 4,090

6 January 2019	New Zealand Breakers	97–84	Perth Wildcats	Spark Arena, Auckland
14:08	Scoring by quarter: 20–27, 27–24, 26–13, 24–20
Sky Sport		boxscore		Attendance: 5,052

6 January 2019	Brisbane Bullets	95–86	Melbourne United	Gold Coast Sports and Leisure Centre, Gold Coast
13:08	Scoring by quarter: 19–23, 29–22, 20–22, 27–19
Fox Sports		boxscore		Attendance: 4,485

7 January 2019	Cairns Taipans	82–86	Sydney Kings	Cairns Convention Centre, Cairns
18:50	Scoring by quarter: 18–29, 22–19, 17–17, 25–21
Fox Sports		boxscore		Attendance: 4,141

=== Round 13 ===
10 January 2019	Illawarra Hawks	96–102	Adelaide 36ers	WIN Entertainment Centre, Wollongong
19:50	Scoring by quarter: 32–22, 21–29, 25–21, 18–30
Fox Sports		boxscore		Attendance: 2,844

11 January 2019	Sydney Kings	100–92	New Zealand Breakers	Qudos Bank Arena, Sydney
19:43	Scoring by quarter: 22–20, 32–32, 22–23, 24–17
Fox Sports		boxscore		Attendance: 8,225

11 January 2019	Perth Wildcats	79–81	Cairns Taipans	RAC Arena, Perth
18:53	Scoring by quarter: 17–20, 15–24, 23–22, 24–15
Fox Sports		boxscore		Attendance: 13,436

12 January 2019	Adelaide 36ers	90–102	Brisbane Bullets	Titanium Security Arena, Adelaide
14:20	Scoring by quarter: 24–21, 25–24, 27–22, 14–35
Fox Sports		boxscore		Attendance: 7,317

13 January 2019	Sydney Kings	84–96	Illawarra Hawks	Qudos Bank Arena, Sydney
14:50	Scoring by quarter: 20–18, 18–28, 16–26, 30–24
Fox Sports		boxscore		Attendance: 7,744

13 January 2019	Cairns Taipans	89–99(OT)	Melbourne United	Cairns Convention Centre, Cairns
16:20	Scoring by quarter: 25–18, 21–14, 26–27, 9–22, Overtime: 8–18
Fox Sports		boxscore		Attendance: 4,364

=== Round 14 ===
17 January 2019	Adelaide 36ers	97–84	Perth Wildcats	Titanium Security Arena, Adelaide
19:20	Scoring by quarter: 23–19, 26–28, 23–14, 25–23
Fox Sports		boxscore		Attendance: 6,611

18 January 2019	Illawarra Hawks	107–96	New Zealand Breakers	WIN Entertainment Centre, Wollongong
19:50	Scoring by quarter: 22–27, 25–25, 26–33, 34–11
Fox Sports		boxscore		Attendance: 2,788

19 January 2019	Sydney Kings	99–119	Adelaide 36ers	Qudos Bank Arena, Sydney
14:50	Scoring by quarter: 22–27, 25–27, 24–33, 28–32
Fox Sports		boxscore		Attendance: 8,071

19 January 2019	Brisbane Bullets	99–68	Cairns Taipans	Brisbane Entertainment Centre, Brisbane
18:50	Scoring by quarter: 31–19, 19–15, 23–11, 26–23
Fox Sports		boxscore		Attendance: 4,373

20 January 2019	Perth Wildcats	84–79	Melbourne United	RAC Arena, Perth
12:00	Scoring by quarter: 27–14, 19–25, 19–23, 19–17
Fox Sports		boxscore		Attendance: 13,353

21 January 2019	Cairns Taipans	106–98(OT)	New Zealand Breakers	Cairns Convention Centre, Cairns
18:50	Scoring by quarter: 26–31, 25–23, 26–22, 14–15, Overtime: 15–7
Fox Sports		boxscore		Attendance: 4,132

=== Round 15 ===
23 January 2019	Melbourne United	113–89	Illawarra Hawks	Melbourne Arena, Melbourne
19:50	Scoring by quarter: 27–20, 31–30, 37–17, 18–22
Fox Sports		boxscore		Attendance: 7,022

24 January 2019	New Zealand Breakers	113–106	Cairns Taipans	TSB Stadium, New Plymouth
19:50	Scoring by quarter: 30–26, 28–25, 24–21, 31–36
Sky Sport		boxscore		Attendance: 2,300

25 January 2019	Brisbane Bullets	81–87	Sydney Kings	Brisbane Convention Centre, Brisbane
18:43	Scoring by quarter: 24–23, 22–24, 19–22, 16–18
Fox Sports		boxscore		Attendance: 5,810

25 January 2019	Perth Wildcats	100–81	Adelaide 36ers	RAC Arena, Perth
18:53	Scoring by quarter: 25–32, 23–13, 29–11, 23–25
Fox Sports		boxscore		Attendance: 12,575

26 January 2019	Illawarra Hawks	82–81	Cairns Taipans	AIS Arena, Canberra
14:50	Scoring by quarter: 34–22, 16–19, 16–25, 16–15
Fox Sports		boxscore		Attendance: not available

27 January 2019	New Zealand Breakers	109–96	Brisbane Bullets	Spark Arena, Auckland
14:20	Scoring by quarter: 26–18, 30–33, 23–22, 30–23
Sky Sport		boxscore		Attendance: 5,116

27 January 2019	Sydney Kings	68–88	Perth Wildcats	Qudos Bank Arena, Sydney
14:50	Scoring by quarter: 23–20, 8–27, 14–21, 23–20
Fox Sports		boxscore		Attendance: 8,729

28 January 2019	Adelaide 36ers	91–114	Melbourne United	Titanium Security Arena, Adelaide
19:20	Scoring by quarter: 20–31, 28–17, 27–34, 16–32
Fox Sports		boxscore		Attendance: not available

=== Round 16 ===
1 February 2019	New Zealand Breakers	87–107	Melbourne United	Spark Arena, Auckland
19:20	Scoring by quarter: 21–30, 13–29, 25–24, 28–24
Sky Sport		boxscore		Attendance: 4,714

1 February 2019	Brisbane Bullets	93–95	Sydney Kings	Brisbane Convention Centre, Brisbane
18:43	Scoring by quarter: 26–27, 17–25, 31–24, 19–19
Fox Sports		boxscore		Attendance: 3,314

1 February 2019	Perth Wildcats	104–90	Illawarra Hawks	RAC Arena, Perth
18:53	Scoring by quarter: 36–27, 24–25, 22–23, 22–15
Fox Sports		boxscore		Attendance: 12,201

2 February 2019	Cairns Taipans	91–100	Adelaide 36ers	Cairns Convention Centre, Cairns
13:50	Scoring by quarter: 19–31, 27–17, 21–31, 24–21
Fox Sports		boxscore		Attendance: 4,142

3 February 2019	Sydney Kings	107–91	Brisbane Bullets	Qudos Bank Arena, Sydney
14:50	Scoring by quarter: 34–18, 23–27, 22–16, 28–30
Fox Sports		boxscore		Attendance: 8,089

3 February 2019	Melbourne United	111–102(OT)	New Zealand Breakers	Melbourne Arena, Melbourne
17:20	Scoring by quarter: 21–29, 25–16, 34–23, 16–28, Overtime: 15–6
Fox Sports		boxscore		Attendance: 9,026

4 February 2019	Illawarra Hawks	110–95	Cairns Taipans	WIN Entertainment Centre, Wollongong
19:50	Scoring by quarter: 30–27, 24–30, 28–14, 28–24
Fox Sports		boxscore		Attendance: 2,273

=== Round 17 ===
7 February 2019	New Zealand Breakers	107–114	Adelaide 36ers	Spark Arena, Auckland
19:20	Scoring by quarter: 24–30, 26–32, 25–26, 32–26
Sky Sport		boxscore		Attendance: 4,570

7 February 2019	Brisbane Bullets	98–87(OT)	Illawarra Hawks	Brisbane Convention Centre, Brisbane
18:50	Scoring by quarter: 27–22, 19–25, 24–19, 14–18, Overtime: 14–3
Fox Sports		boxscore		Attendance: 2,297

8 February 2019	Sydney Kings	97–85	Melbourne United	Qudos Bank Arena, Sydney
19:50	Scoring by quarter: 21–21, 25–18, 27–22, 24–24
Fox Sports		boxscore		Attendance: 7,104

9 February 2019	Cairns Taipans	79–68	Brisbane Bullets	Cairns Convention Centre, Cairns
13:50	Scoring by quarter: 18–11, 21–21, 13–13, 27–23
Fox Sports		boxscore		Attendance: 5,006

9 February 2019	Illawarra Hawks	81–96	New Zealand Breakers	WIN Entertainment Centre, Wollongong
19:50	Scoring by quarter: 18–26, 21–23, 21–24, 21–23
Fox Sports		boxscore		Attendance: 3,142

10 February 2019	Adelaide 36ers	87–89	Melbourne United	Titanium Security Arena, Adelaide
14:20	Scoring by quarter: 26–23, 26–25, 18–16, 17–25
Fox Sports		boxscore		Attendance: not available

10 February 2019	Perth Wildcats	95–86(OT)	Sydney Kings	RAC Arena, Perth
14:20	Scoring by quarter: 12–26, 16–12, 23–17, 26–22, Overtime: 18–9
Fox Sports		boxscore		Attendance: 13,520

=== Round 18 ===
14 February 2019	New Zealand Breakers	130–96	Illawarra Hawks	TSB Arena, Wellington
19:20	Scoring by quarter: 34–24, 29–25, 37–21, 30–26
Sky Sport		boxscore		Attendance: 2,336

14 February 2019	Melbourne United	85–87	Cairns Taipans	Melbourne Arena, Melbourne
19:50	Scoring by quarter: 19–24, 23–26, 23–23, 20–14
Fox Sports		boxscore		Attendance: 6,590

15 February 2019	Perth Wildcats	93–85	Adelaide 36ers	RAC Arena, Perth
18:50	Scoring by quarter: 17–25, 23–24, 25–20, 28–16
Fox Sports		boxscore		Attendance: 13,525

16 February 2019	Sydney Kings	89–84	Cairns Taipans	Qudos Bank Arena, Sydney
14:50	Scoring by quarter: 29–22, 18–21, 19–22, 23–19
Fox Sports		boxscore		Attendance: 8,622

16 February 2019	Brisbane Bullets	84–78	New Zealand Breakers	Brisbane Convention Centre, Brisbane
18:50	Scoring by quarter: 26–25, 21–17, 15–18, 22–18
Fox Sports		boxscore		Attendance: 3,322

17 February 2019	Melbourne United	81–70(OT)	Perth Wildcats	Melbourne Arena, Melbourne
14:50	Scoring by quarter: 12–16, 17–18, 16–18, 23–16, Overtime: 13–2
Fox Sports		boxscore		Attendance: 10,300

== Ladder ==
Pos	2018–19 NBL season											
Pos	Team	Pld	W	L	PCT	Last 5	Streak	Home	Away	PF	PA	PP
1	Perth Wildcats^{1}	28	18	10	64.29%	4–1	L1	12–2	6–8	2499	2355	106.11%
2	Melbourne United^{1}	28	18	10	64.29%	3–2	W1	10–4	8–6	2586	2478	104.36%
3	Sydney Kings^{1}	28	18	10	64.29%	4–1	W1	9–5	9–5	2438	2380	102.44%
4	Brisbane Bullets^{2}	28	14	14	50.00%	2–3	W1	9–5	5–9	2503	2480	100.93%
5	Adelaide 36ers^{2}	28	14	14	50.00%	2–3	L2	6–8	8–6	2687	2681	100.22%
6	New Zealand Breakers^{3}	28	12	16	42.86%	2–3	L1	7–7	5–9	2649	2641	100.30%
7	Illawarra Hawks^{3}	28	12	16	42.86%	1–4	L3	8–6	4–10	2493	2664	93.58%
8	Cairns Taipans	28	6	22	21.43%	2–3	L1	3–11	3–11	2400	2576	93.17%

Updated to match(es) played on 17 February 2019. Source: NBL.com.au

The NBL tie-breaker system as outlined in the NBL Rules and Regulations states that in the case of an identical win-loss record, the overall points percentage between the teams will determine order of seeding.

^{1}Perth Wildcats won on overall points percentage. Melbourne United finished 2nd on overall points percentage.

^{2}Brisbane Bullets won on overall points percentage.

^{3}New Zealand Breakers won on overall points percentage.

Preceded by 2017–18 season	NBL seasons 2018–19	Succeeded by 2019–20 season
