= Gibraltar national rugby union team =

Gibraltar
- Union: Gibraltar Rugby Football Union
Team kit

First international
- Belgium A 21–8 Gibraltar (Brussels, Belgium; 5 November 2011)

Largest win
- Montenegro 7–55 Gibraltar (Tivat, Montenegro; 5 November 2016)

Largest defeat
- Malaysia 49–0 Gibraltar (Kajang, Malaysia; 6 April 2016)

World Cup
- Appearances: 0

The Gibraltar national rugby union team represent Gibraltar in men's rugby union.

The nation is not currently affiliated to World Rugby and have yet to qualify for a World Cup.

On 5 November 2011 the Gibraltar Rugby Football Union (GRFU) fielded a national team in its first official Test Match. The fixture was against the Belgium Development Team and was held in Brussels. The final score was: Belgium Development 20 – Gibraltar 8.

Test Caps have officially been awarded to the Gibraltar team players, this came after playing and defeating a Cyprus XV and an Israel A team. Their first full international came against Malta in March 2015.

The GRFU went through the process of FIRA/AER (European Rugby Federation) membership. The GRFU had planned other international fixtures for April 2012. This however was blocked by Spain. This came as a surprise as UEFA and the ICC recognise Gibraltar.

The Gibraltar national rugby sevens team plays regularly in tournaments, particularly in the Tangier Sevens.

== International record ==
Date	Home	Score	Away	Venue	Referee	Competition
5 November 2011	Belgium XV	21–8	Gibraltar	Brussels, Belgium	unknown	Friendly (First International)
23 March 2013	Gibraltar	36–10	Cyprus XV	Victoria Stadium, Gibraltar	unknown	Friendly
22 February 2014	Gibraltar	25–12	Israel A	Victoria Stadium, Gibraltar	Julian Bevan (SWE)	Friendly
7 March 2015	Gibraltar	8–33	Malta	Victoria Stadium, Gibraltar	Ranbir Dhillon (GBR)	Friendly (First full International)
17 October 2015	Malta	14–29	Gibraltar	Malta	unknown	Friendly
6 April 2016	Malaysia	49–0	Gibraltar	Kajang, Malaysia	unknown	Friendly
8 April 2016	Singapore	13–13	Gibraltar	Yio Chu Kang Stadium	unknown	Friendly
5 November 2016	Montenegro	7–55	Gibraltar	Tivat Arsenal Stadium, Montenegro	Petra Druskovic (CRO)	Friendly
8 April 2017	Gibraltar	22–17	Finland	Victoria Stadium, Gibraltar	Matthew Shales (GBR)	Friendly
6 October 2017	Hungary	15–21	Gibraltar	Mandok, Hungary	unknown	Friendly
24 February 2018	Gibraltar	33–14	Hungary	Victoria Stadium, Gibraltar	George Pounder (SRU)	Friendly
17 March 2018	Gibraltar	17–5	Finland	Victoria Stadium, Gibraltar	Fergus Hollins (SRU)	Friendly
27 April 2018	United Arab Emirates	28–15	Gibraltar	Dubai, United Arab Emirates	R. Drake	Friendly
10 October 2018	Israel	20–17	Gibraltar	Netanya, Israel	unknown	Friendly
13 April 2019	Denmark	26–22	Gibraltar	Copenhagen, Denmark	unknown	Friendly
4 May 2019	Sweden	26–31	Gibraltar	Vilamoura, Portugal	David Young (SRU)	Friendly
28 September 2019	Gibraltar	22–6	Bermuda	Europa Point, Gibraltar	Charles Samson (SRU)	Friendly
9 October 2022	Bermuda	33–16	Gibraltar	National Sports Centre, Bermuda	unknown	Friendly
26 November 2022	Jamaica	18–36	Gibraltar	Birmingham Moseley Rugby	unknown	Friendly
25 March 2023	Gibraltar	20–15	Jamaica	Europa Point, Gibraltar	Elgan Williams (WRU)	Friendly
7 September 2024	Denmark	33–7	Gibraltar	Hundested RK	unknown	Friendly
5 December 2025	Gibraltar becomes an associate member of Rugby Europe					
10 January 2026	Gibraltar	31-24	Finland	Europa Sports Park, Gibraltar	unknown	Friendly
21 March 2026	Gibraltar	13-37	Sweden	Europa Sports Park, Gibraltar		Friendly
26 September 2026	Gibraltar	17-28	Malta	Chiswick RFC, London		Friendly
17 October 2026	Gibraltar		Cyprus	Europa Sports Park, Gibraltar		2026-27 Rugby Europe Conference
16 January 2027	Gibraltar		Andorra	Europa Sports Park, Gibraltar		2026-27 Rugby Europe Conference
17 April 2027	Israel		Gibraltar	TBC		2026-27 Rugby Europe Conference

== See also ==
- Rugby union in Gibraltar
