= Gibraltar Rugby Football Union =

Governing body of rugby union in Gibraltar

- Sport: Rugby union
- Founded: 1945
- Headquarters: Europa Sports Park, Europa Point, Gibraltar
- President: Stephen Payas

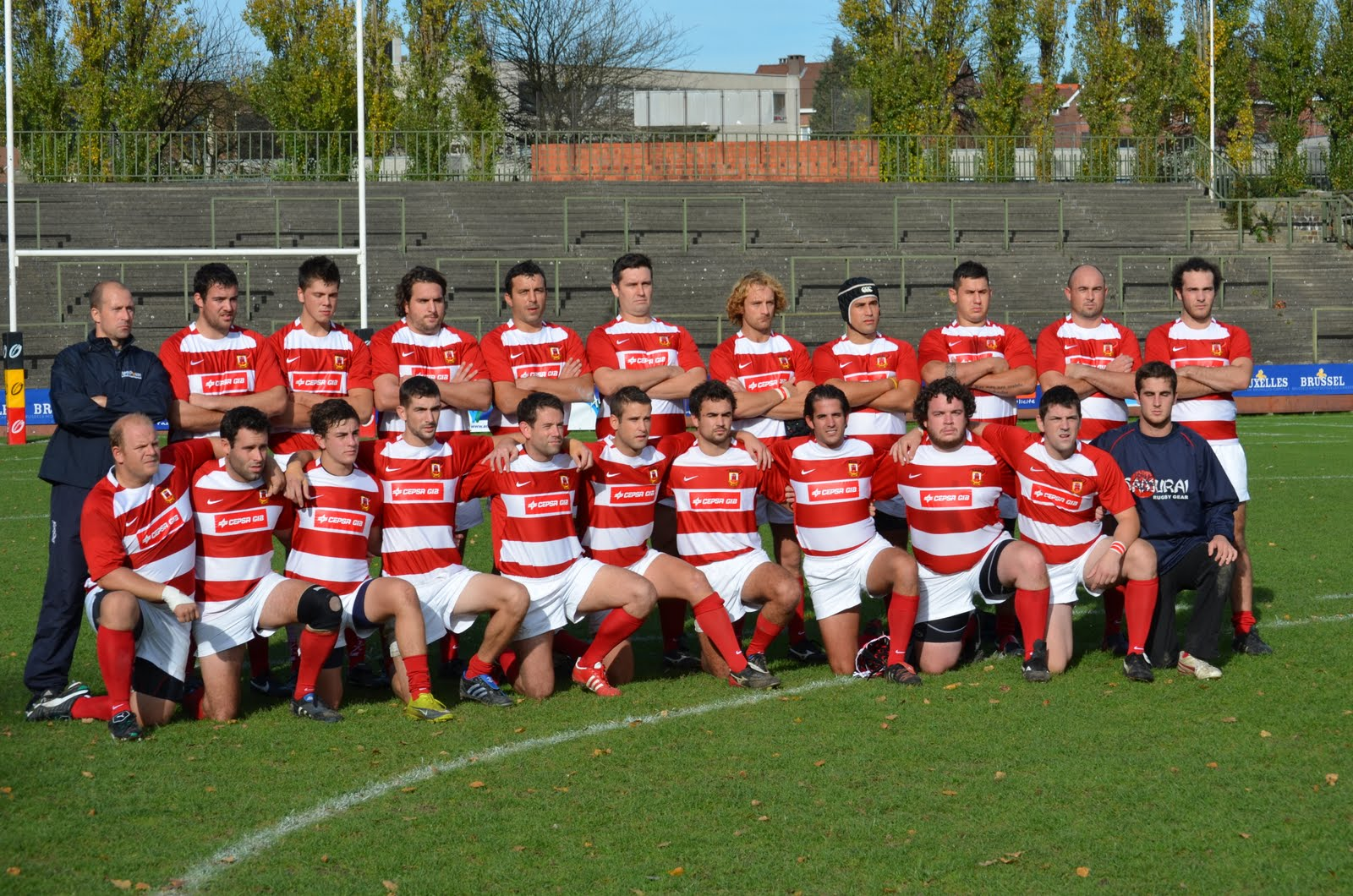

The Gibraltar Rugby Football Union is the governing body for rugby in Gibraltar. It oversees the development of the sport in the territory.

Europa Sports Park is where Gibraltar Rugby host all of their Gibraltar national rugby union team home games, as well as the training and match base for the four Gibraltar Rugby Football Union clubs: Ibex Buccaneers, the Rock Scorpions, the Straits Sharks and Europa Stormers who all play in the u-mee Gibraltar Rugby Championship. The recent addition of the Trusted Novus bank Youth rugby festival also increases the rugby offer for young people on the rock.

== See also ==
- Rugby union in Gibraltar
- Gibraltar national rugby union team
