= Athletics at the 1974 British Commonwealth Games – Women's discus throw =

Women's discus throw at the Commonwealth Games

The women's discus throw event at the 1974 British Commonwealth Games was held on 26 January at the Queen Elizabeth II Park in Christchurch, New Zealand.

== Medalists ==
Gold	Silver	Bronze
Jane Haist; Canada	Rosemary Payne; Scotland	Carol Martin; Canada

== Results ==
=== Qualification ===
Rank	Name	Nationality	Result	Notes
	Gael Martin	Australia	46.86	
	Jean Roberts	Australia	46.70	
	Sue Culley	Australia	43.72	
13	Herina Malit	Kenya	34.20	
14	Rose Chamangwana	Malawi	32.40	

=== Final ===
Held on 26 January.

Rank	Name	Nationality	Result	Notes
1st place, gold medalist(s)	Jane Haist	Canada	55.52	GR
2nd place, silver medalist(s)	Rosemary Payne	Scotland	53.94	
3rd place, bronze medalist(s)	Carol Martin	Canada	53.16	
4	Jean Roberts	Australia	53.12	
5	Dorothy Swinyard	England	51.30	
6	Meg Ritchie	Scotland	51.02	
7	Sally-Ann Mene	New Zealand	48.80	
8	Sue Culley	Australia	48.04	
9	Gael Martin	Australia	46.12	
10	Rose Hart	Ghana	41.32	
11	Mereoni Vibose	Fiji	40.66	
12	Losaline Faka'ata	Tonga	34.24	
