= 2025 Netball World Youth Cup =

International netball tournament hosted by Gibraltar

Tournament details
- Host country: Gibraltar
- Venue(s): Europa Sports Park; Tercentenary Sports Hall
- Dates: 19–28 September 2025
- Teams: 18
- TV partner(s): NetballPass; YouTube

Final positions
- Champions: Australia (5th title)
- Runners-up: New Zealand
- Third place: England

Tournament statistics
- Matches played: 57

2025 Netball World Youth Cup was the ninth Netball World Youth Cup tournament. Eighteen teams, including the hosts Gibraltar, featured in a series of matches played in September 2025 at Europa Sports Park and Tercentenary Sports Hall. Australia won the tournament after defeating New Zealand 63–48 in the final. Australia's Lily Graham was named Player of the Tournament. England finished the tournament in third place after defeating South Africa 55–35 in a play-off. The series was live streamed on NetballPass and on YouTube. World Netball reported that the tournament reached more than 26 million people across its digital platforms, the highest audience recorded for the competition.

== Qualification ==
Gibraltar qualified automatically as the host nation. The others qualified via the 2017 Netball World Youth Cup and a series of regional qualifying tournaments.

Tournament	Qualifier 1	Qualifier 2	Qualifier 3	Qualifier 4
2017 Netball World Youth Cup	Australia	New Zealand	England	Fiji
Africa	South Africa	Malawi	Zambia	
Americas	Jamaica	Barbados	Trinidad and Tobago	
Asia	Malaysia	Singapore	Sri Lanka	
Europe	Scotland	Wales	Northern Ireland	
Oceania	Samoa	Tonga	Cook Islands	

== Sri Lanka and Zambia withdrawn ==
On 19 September, it was reported that, due to unforeseen circumstances both Sri Lanka and Zambia had not arrived in Gibraltar. As a result they both had to forfeit their Round 1 matches. Wins were recorded for New Zealand and England in these matches, with 2 points awarded to each team. By 21 September, the situation remained unresolved and World Netball decided to withdraw Sri Lanka and Zambia from the whole tournament. All their matches were subsequently forfeited and their opponents were each awarded 2 points.

== Match officials ==
Umpires

Umpire	Association
Justin Barnes	Australia
Nathan Begley	Australia
Tamara Buriani-Gennai	Australia
Makeba Clarke	Barbados
Louise Cole	England
Rhian Edwards	Wales
Myron Elkington	New Zealand
Tania Fink	New Zealand
Moeth Gaymes	St Vincent and the Grenadines
Gillian Leslie	Scotland
Tim Marshall	Australia
Leonard Masao	South Africa
Sasha McLeod	New Zealand
Zak Middleton	New Zealand
Theophilus Moletsane	South Africa
Cory Nicholls	New Zealand
Tharina Opperman	South Africa
Lizzie Saunby	England
Lizzie Saywell	England
Georgina Sulley-Beales	Australia
Jessica Teng	Singapore
Sophia Wilson	England
Nadine Pardo-Zammit	Gibraltar

Umpire Appointments Panel

Umpire	Association
Cheryl Danson	England
Margaret Deighan	England
Anne Marie Dickson-Lewis	Trinidad and Tobago
Kirsten Lloyd	New Zealand
David Pala'amo	New Zealand
Annette Smith	Australia
Marielouw Van der Merwe	South Africa

== Group A ==
=== Matches ===
Round 1

Saturday, 20 September 2025	Gibraltar	29–74	Cook Islands	Europa Sports Park
10:00		Report

Saturday, 20 September 2025	New Zealand	v	Zambia	Tercentenary Sports Hall
10:00

Round 2

Sunday, 21 September 2025	Gibraltar	28–59	Malaysia	Europa Sports Park
12:00

Sunday, 21 September 2025	New Zealand	74–47	Cook Islands	Tercentenary Sports Hall
12:00		Report

Round 3

Monday, 22 September 2025	Gibraltar	v	Zambia	Europa Sports Park
17:00

Monday, 22 September 2025	Cook Islands	66–44	Malaysia	Tercentenary Sports Hall
17:00

Round 4

Tuesday, 23 September 2025	New Zealand	80–20	Malaysia	Europa Sports Park
19:00		Report

Tuesday, 23 September 2025	Cook Islands	v	Zambia	Tercentenary Sports Hall
19:00

Round 5

Wednesday, 24 September 2025	Gibraltar	8–95	New Zealand	Europa Sports Park
17:00

Wednesday, 24 September 2025	Malaysia	v	Zambia	Tercentenary Sports Hall
17:00

=== Final table ===
Pos	Team	P	W	D	L	GF	GA	GD	Pts
1	New Zealand	4	4	0	0	249	75	+174	8
2	Cook Islands	4	3	0	1	187	147	+40	6
3	Malaysia	4	2	0	2	123	174	-51	4
4	Gibraltar	4	1	0	3	65	228	-163	2
5	Zambia	n/a	0	0	4	0	0	0	0

Qualified for 1st/8th quarter-finals
Qualified for 9th/16th quarter-finals
Withdrawn from tournament

== Group B ==
=== Matches ===
Round 1

Saturday, 20 September 2025	Australia	79–15	Northern Ireland	Europa Sports Park
12:00

Saturday, 20 September 2025	Scotland	51–49	Samoa	Tercentenary Sports Hall
12:00

Round 2

Sunday, 21 September 2025	Scotland	64–21	Northern Ireland	Europa Sports Park
19:00

Sunday, 21 September 2025	Australia	92–25	Singapore	Tercentenary Sports Hall
19:00

Round 3

Monday, 22 September 2025	Samoa	62–41	Singapore	Europa Sports Park
12:00

Monday, 22 September 2025	Australia	69–42	Scotland	Tercentenary Sports Hall
12:00

Round 4

Tuesday, 23 September 2025	Australia	65–36	Samoa	Europa Sports Park
10:00

Tuesday, 23 September 2025	Singapore	50–32	Northern Ireland	Tercentenary Sports Hall
10:00

Round 5

Wednesday, 24 September 2025	Samoa	69–29	Northern Ireland	Tercentenary Sports Hall
10:00

Wednesday, 24 September 2025	Scotland	60–35	Singapore	Europa Sports Park
12:00

=== Final table ===
Pos	Team	P	W	D	L	GF	GA	GD	Pts
1	Australia	4	4	0	0	305	118	+187	8
2	Scotland	4	3	0	1	217	199	+18	6
3	Samoa	4	2	0	2	216	186	+30	4
4	Singapore	4	1	0	3	151	246	-95	2
5	Northern Ireland	4	0	0	4	97	262	-165	0

Qualified for 1st/8th quarter-finals
Qualified for 9th/16th quarter-finals
Qualified for 17th/18th play-off

== Group C ==
=== Matches ===
Round 1

Saturday, 20 September 2025	England	v	Sri Lanka	Europa Sports Park
17:00

Saturday, 20 September 2025	Wales	58–40	Tonga	Tercentenary Sports Hall
17:00

Round 2

Sunday, 21 September 2025	Jamaica	66–43	Tonga	Europa Sports Park
10:00

Sunday, 21 September 2025	Wales	v	Sri Lanka	Tercentenary Sports Hall
10:00

Round 3

Monday, 22 September 2025	England	65–28	Wales	Europa Sports Park
19:00

Monday, 22 September 2025	Jamaica	v	Sri Lanka	Tercentenary Sports Hall
19:00

Round 4

Tuesday, 23 September 2025	Jamaica	61–43	Wales	Europa Sports Park
12:00

Tuesday, 23 September 2025	England	72–25	Tonga	Tercentenary Sports Hall
12:00

Round 5

Wednesday, 24 September 2025	Tonga	v	Sri Lanka	Europa Sports Park
12:00

Wednesday, 24 September 2025	England	64–33	Jamaica	Tercentenary Sports Hall
12:00

=== Final table ===
Pos	Team	P	W	D	L	GF	GA	GD	Pts
1	England	4	4	0	0	201	86	+115	8
2	Jamaica	4	3	0	1	160	150	+10	6
3	Wales	4	2	0	2	129	166	-17	4
4	Tonga	4	1	0	3	108	196	-88	2
5	Sri Lanka	n/a	0	0	4	0	0	0	0

Qualified for 1st/8th quarter-finals
Qualified for 9th/16th quarter-finals
Withdrawn from tournament

== Group D ==
=== Matches ===
Round 1

Saturday, 20 September 2025	South Africa	102–27	Barbados	Europa Sports Park
19:00		Report

Saturday, 20 September 2025	Fiji	53–40	Trinidad and Tobago	Tercentenary Sports Hall
19:00

Round 2

Sunday, 21 September 2025	Malawi	65–29	Trinidad and Tobago	Europa Sports Park
17:00

Sunday, 21 September 2025	Fiji	66–34	Barbados	Tercentenary Sports Hall
17:00

Round 3

Monday, 22 September 2025	Malawi	52–51	Fiji	Europa Sports Park
10:00

Monday, 22 September 2025	South Africa	105–15	Trinidad and Tobago	Tercentenary Sports Hall
10:00		Report

Round 4

Tuesday, 23 September 2025	Trinidad and Tobago	58–33	Barbados	Europa Sports Park
17:00

Tuesday, 23 September 2025	South Africa	64–33	Malawi	Tercentenary Sports Hall
17:00		Report

Round 5

Wednesday, 24 September 2025	South Africa	86–35	Fiji	Europa Sports Park
19:00		Report

Wednesday, 24 September 2025	Malawi	70–23	Barbados	Tercentenary Sports Hall
19:00

=== Final table ===
Pos	Team	P	W	D	L	GF	GA	GD	Pts
1	South Africa	4	4	0	0	357	110	+247	8
2	Malawi	4	3	0	1	220	167	+53	6
3	Fiji	4	2	0	2	205	212	-7	4
4	Trinidad and Tobago	4	1	0	3	142	256	-114	2
5	Barbados	4	0	0	4	117	296	-179	0

Qualified for 1st/8th quarter-finals
Qualified for 9th/16th quarter-finals
Qualified for 17th/18th play-off

== 9th/18th Classification ==
=== 9th/16th quarter-finals ===
Thursday, 25 September 2025	Malaysia	52–40	Trinidad and Tobago	Tercentenary Sports Hall
11:00

Thursday, 25 September 2025	Wales	57–39	Singapore	Tercentenary Sports Hall
13:00

Thursday, 25 September 2025	Gibraltar	31–61	Fiji	Tercentenary Sports Hall
17:00

Thursday, 25 September 2025	Samoa	62–46	Tonga	Tercentenary Sports Hall
19:00

=== 13th/16th semi-finals ===
Friday, 26 September 2025	Gibraltar	36–71	Tonga	Europa Sports Park
11:00

Friday, 26 September 2025	Trinidad and Tobago	67–58	Singapore	Tercentenary Sports Hall
11:00

=== 9th/12th Semi-finals ===
Friday, 26 September 2025	Wales	67–39	Malaysia	Tercentenary Sports Hall
17:00

Friday, 26 September 2025	Samoa	71–53	Fiji	Tercentenary Sports Hall
19:00

=== 17th/18th play-off ===
Saturday, 27 September 2025	Northern Ireland	49–29	Barbados	Tercentenary Sports Hall
09:00

=== 15th/16th play-off ===
Saturday, 27 September 2025	Gibraltar	34–45	Trinidad and Tobago	Tercentenary Sports Hall
11:00

=== 13th/14th play-off ===
Saturday, 27 September 2025	Tonga	50–47	Singapore	Tercentenary Sports Hall
13:00

=== 11th/12th play-off ===
Saturday, 27 September 2025	Fiji	56–48	Malaysia	Europa Sports Park
15:00

=== 9th/10th play-off ===
Saturday, 27 September 2025	Samoa	67–53	Wales	Europa Sports Park
17:00

== 1st/8th Classification ==
=== 1st/8th quarter-finals ===
Thursday, 25 September 2025	England	64–33	Scotland	Europa Sports Park
11:00

Thursday, 25 September 2025	New Zealand	67–34	Malawi	Europa Sports Park
13:00		Report

Thursday, 25 September 2025	Australia	85–33	Jamaica	Europa Sports Park
17:00

Thursday, 25 September 2025	South Africa	79–45	Cook Islands	Europa Sports Park
19:00		Report

=== 5th/8th Semi-finals ===
Friday, 26 September 2025	Jamaica	57–47	Cook Islands	Europa Sports Park
13:00

Friday, 26 September 2025	Scotland	46–42	Malawi	Tercentenary Sports Hall
13:00

=== 1st/4th Semi-finals ===
Friday, 26 September 2025	New Zealand	55–35	England	Europa Sports Park
17:00		Report

Friday, 26 September 2025	Australia	67–36	South Africa	Europa Sports Park
19:00		Report

=== 7th/8th play-off ===
Sunday, 28 September 2025	Malawi	61–54	Cook Islands	Europa Sports Park
09:00

=== 5th/6th play-off ===
Sunday, 28 September 2025	Jamaica	53–44	Scotland	Europa Sports Park
11:00

=== 3rd/4th play-off ===
Sunday, 28 September 2025	England	55–35	South Africa	Europa Sports Park
17:00

=== Final ===
Sunday, 28 September 2025; 19:00	Australia	63–48	New Zealand	Europa Sports Park; Umpires: Lizzie Saunby, Louise Cole; Reserve umpire: Sophia Wilson
Sunday, 28 September 2025; 19:00	Scoring by quarter: 15–14, 27–25, 47–34, 63–48			Europa Sports Park; Umpires: Lizzie Saunby, Louise Cole; Reserve umpire: Sophia Wilson

== Final Placings ==
Rank	Team
1st place, gold medalist(s)	Australia
2nd place, silver medalist(s)	New Zealand
3rd place, bronze medalist(s)	England
4	South Africa
5	Jamaica
6	Scotland
7	Malawi
8	Cook Islands
9	Samoa
10	Wales
11	Fiji
12	Malaysia
13	Tonga
14	Singapore
15	Trinidad and Tobago
16	Gibraltar
17	Northern Ireland
18	Barbados
