= Straits Sharks =

- Founded: 2010
- Location: Gibraltar
Team kit

Straits Sharks (known as Inline Framing Sharks for sponsorship reasons) is a Gibraltarian rugby team. They operate as a franchise rather than a traditional club, like all teams in the Gibraltarian domestic structure. As the name implies, the team is named after the Strait of Gibraltar
