= Europa Sports Park =

Multi-purpose stadium in Gibraltar

- Europa Point Stadium
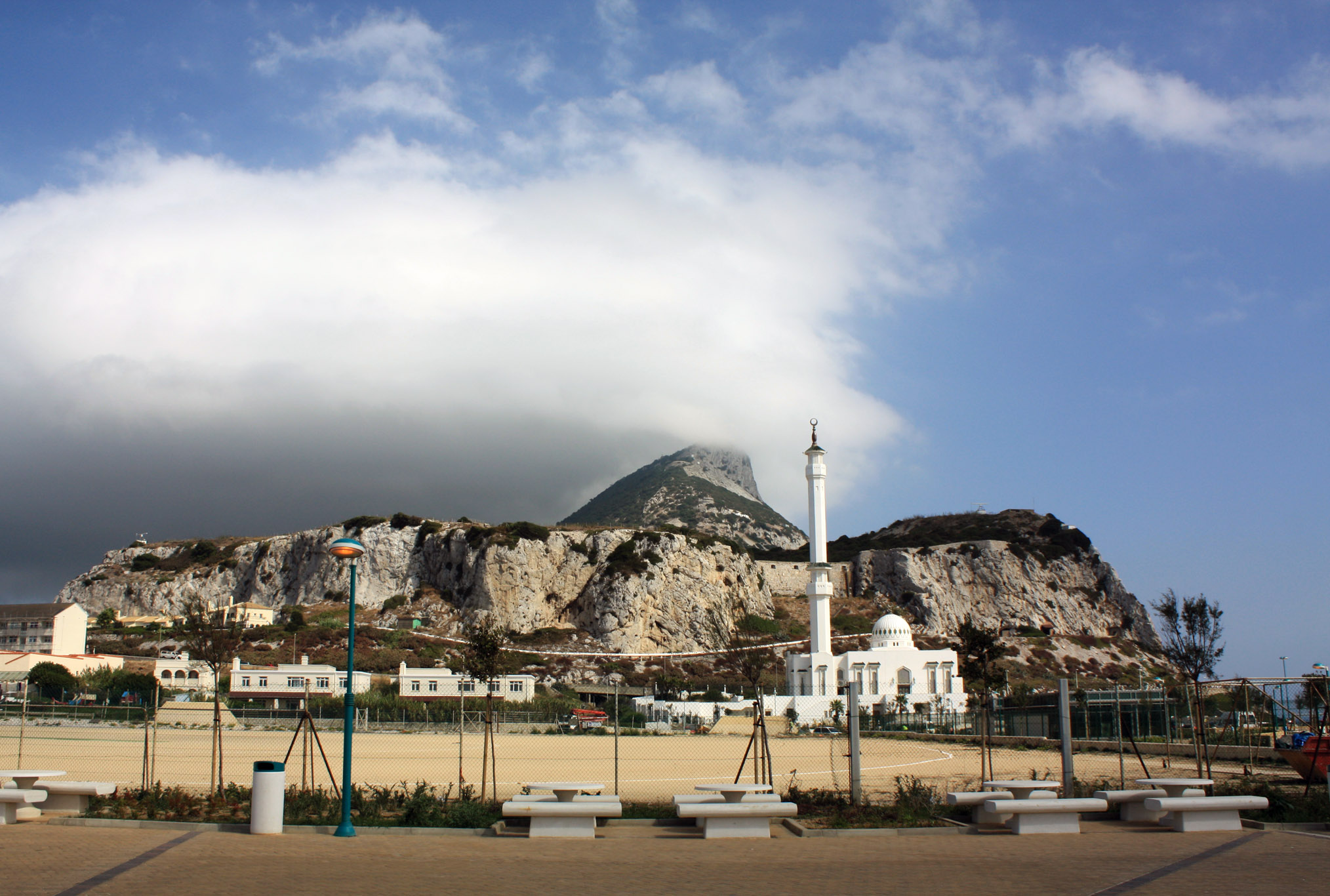
- Europa Sports Park in 2011
- Interactive map of Europa Sports Park
- Location: Europa Point, Gibraltar
- Coordinates: 36°06′38.5″N 5°20′48.3″W
- Owner: HM Government Gibraltar
- Surface: Artificial turf

Tenants
- Gibraltar national rugby union team (2019–present); Gibraltar Rugby Football Union (Note: All National & Domestic Gibraltar Rugby Union teams) (2019–present); Gibraltar national football team (2024–present)

Europa Sports Park
- Interactive map of Europa Sports Park

Ground information
- End names
- n/a n/a

International information
- First men's T20I: 4 May 2023: Malta v Portugal
- Last men's T20I: 30 September 2024: Gibraltar v Serbia
- First women's T20I: 20 April 2024: Gibraltar v Estonia
- Last women's T20I: 16 December 2024: Gibraltar v Jersey
- As of 16 December 2024; Source: ESPNcricinfo

Europa Sports Park is a multi-purpose stadium at Europa Point, Gibraltar. In UEFA matches, the stadium is referred to as Europa Point Stadium.

The facility is home to the Gibraltar national rugby union team, as well as other sports such as cricket, darts, gymnastics, squash and more. The rugby uses the facility to host all their home national team games, as well as the training and match base for the four Gibraltar Rugby Football Union clubs: Ibex Buccaneers, the Rock Scorpions, the Straits Sharks and Europa Stormers who all play in the u-mee Gibraltar Rugby Championship. The Trusted Novus Bank Youth Rugby Festival also recently joined the lineup of events and activities at the park.

== History ==
In February 2014 the Gibraltar Football Association unveiled plans for a UEFA Category 4 multi-function stadium; however, after the association were offered the opportunity to purchase Victoria Stadium, that proposal was abandoned.

The Government of Gibraltar developed their own plans for a new multi-sports facilities stadium; the site they selected was at Europa Point which was previously a Ministry of Defence cricket pitch. The new stadium, designed by AKS Gibraltar, was completed at Europa Point in 2016.

It hosted the 2019 Island Games opening ceremony and also hosted the annual Gibraltar Music Festival.

On 27 March 2021, Europa Sports Park was the venue for the Alexander Povetkin vs. Dillian Whyte boxing match.

In January 2024 new plans were unveiled to upgrade the facilities to meet UEFA Category 2 requirements, which would allow matches to be held there while Victoria Stadium is rebuilt. Permission to use Europa Point Stadium for international matches from September 2024 was granted by UEFA in May 2024.

In September 2025, Europa Sports Park, along with Tercentenary Sports Hall, co-hosted the 2025 Netball World Youth Cup. Eighteen teams, including the Gibraltar national netball team, featured in the tournament. Europa Sports Park hosted the majority of the significant matches, including all the main quarter-finals, semi-finals, 3rd/4th play-off and final.

== Florence Nightingale Field Hospital ==
A COVID-19 field hospital was set up at the site, in line with those set up in the UK mainland.

== See also ==
- Football in Gibraltar
- Sport in Gibraltar
