= Chris Sua'mene =

Samoan discus thrower

Personal information
- Nationality: Samoan
- Born: 16 August 1972 (age 54)

Sport
- Sport: Athletics
- Event: Discus throw

Christopher Sua'mene (born 16 August 1972) is a Samoan athlete. He competed in the men's discus throw at the 1996 Summer Olympics. Sua'mene's parents are Mene Mene, a duathlete, and Sally Mene, a javelin and discus thrower.
