= Sally Mene =

New Zealand discus and javelin thrower (born 1949)

Personal information
- Born: Sally Ann Flynn; 2 December 1949 (age 76)

Sport
- Country: New Zealand
- Sport: Track and field
- Events: Discus throw; Javelin throw

Achievements and titles
- National finals: Discus champion (1970, 1971, 1974); Javelin champion (1965, 1966, 1968, 1969, 1970, 1971, 1974)

Sally Ann Mene (née Flynn; born 2 December 1949) is a former New Zealand discus and javelin thrower. She competed at both the 1970 and 1974 British Commonwealth Games.

Flynn married Mene Mene, a decathlete, in 1970, and they had three children together. Their son Chris Mene is also a discus thrower, and their daughter Bernice Mene was captain of the New Zealand netball team, the Silver Ferns.
