= 2027 Rugby Europe Championship =

- Date: 6 February – 14 March 2027
- Countries: Belgium; Georgia; Netherlands; Poland; Portugal; Romania; Spain; Switzerland

Tournament statistics

The 2027 Rugby Europe Championship will be the eleventh Rugby Europe Championship, the annual rugby union competition for the top European national teams outside the Six Nations Championship, and the 55rd edition of the competition (including all its previous incarnations as the FIRA Tournament, Rugby Union European Cup, FIRA Nations Cup, FIRA Trophy, and European Nations Cup).

Eight teams will take part in the 2027 championship. The championship will be contested by Belgium, Georgia, the Netherlands, Poland, Portugal, Romania, Spain and Switzerland.

Portugal will enter the tournament as defending champions. They won the final against Georgia in the 2026 tournament, claiming their 2nd title. The serpentine system was applied to allocate each team to their respective groups. Each team played a total of five games (three round robin group matches to determine the team's path and two play-off matches). Seeding (for a group) and relegation are calculated over a one-year cycle, as is the promotion from the Trophy competition.

== Participants ==
Nation	Stadium			Head coach	Captain
Nation	Home stadium	Capacity	Location	Head coach	Captain
Belgium	Stade Charles Tondreau; Province Naimette Arena	8,000; 5,000	Mons; Liège	(France) Laurent Dossat	Jens Torfs
Georgia	Avchala Stadium	3,500	Tbilisi	(France) Pierre-Henry Broncan	Vasil Lobzhanidze
Netherlands	NRCA Stadium	7,000	Amsterdam	(Scotland) Bryan Easson	Mees Voets
Poland	Narodowy Stadion Rugby	2,425	Gdynia	(Wales) Christian Hitt	Piotr Zeszutek
Portugal	Estádio Nacional; Estádio do Restelo	37,593; 19,856	Oeiras; Lisbon	(New Zealand) Simon Mannix	Tomás Appleton
Romania	Arcul de Triumf Stadium	8,207	Bucharest	(France) David Gérard	Ovidiu Cojocaru
Spain	Estadio Nacional Complutense	6,000	Madrid	(Argentina) Pablo Bouza	Jon Zabala
Switzerland	Stade Municipal Yverdon	6,600	Yverdon-les-Bains	(France) Olivier Nier	Cyril Lin

== Tables and Fixtures ==
=== Group A ===
Pos	Team	Pld	W	D	L	PF	PA	PD	TF	TA	TB	LB	Pts	Qualification
1	Belgium	0	0	0	0	0	0	0	0	0	0	0	0	Grand Finals Semi-Finals
2	Georgia	0	0	0	0	0	0	0	0	0	0	0	0	Grand Finals Semi-Finals
3	Poland	0	0	0	0	0	0	0	0	0	0	0	0	Ranking Finals Semi-Finals
4	Romania	0	0	0	0	0	0	0	0	0	0	0	0	Ranking Finals Semi-Finals

First match(es) will be played: unknown. Source: Rugby Europe
Rules for classification:
If two teams have the same number of points the best ranked will be: 1) match points in the games played between the tied Unions; 2) tries in the games played between the tied Unions; 3) match points difference in all pool games; 4) tries difference for in all pool games; 5) match points for in all pool games.
If three or more teams have same number of points, the best ranked will be: 1) match points difference in all pool games; 2) tries for in all pool games; 4) match points for in all pool games.
Points were awarded to the teams as follows: Win – 4 points, Draw – 2 points, At least 3 more tries than opponent – 1 point, Loss within 7 points – 1 point

==== Week 1 ====
6 February 2027
15:15 CET (UTC+1)

Belgium	v	Romania

TBA
Referee: TBA

6 February 2027
19:30 CET (UTC+1)

Poland	v	Georgia

Narodowy Stadion Rugby, Gdynia
Referee: TBA

==== Week 2 ====
12 February 2027
18:00 EET (UTC+2)

Romania	v	Poland

Arcul de Triumf Stadium, Bucharest
Referee: TBA

13 February 2027
20:00 CET (UTC+1)

Belgium	v	Georgia

TBA
Referee: TBA

==== Week 3 ====
20 February 2027
18:00 CET (UTC+1)

Georgia	v	Romania

Avchala Rugby Stadium, Tbilisi
Referee: TBA

20-February 2027
19:30 CET (UTC+1)

Poland	v	Belgium

Narodowy Stadion Rugby, Gdynia
Referee: TBA

=== Group B ===
Pos	Team	Pld	W	D	L	PF	PA	PD	TF	TA	TB	LB	Pts	Qualification
1	Netherlands	0	0	0	0	0	0	0	0	0	0	0	0	Grand Finals Semi-Finals
2	Portugal	0	0	0	0	0	0	0	0	0	0	0	0	Grand Finals Semi-Finals
3	Spain	0	0	0	0	0	0	0	0	0	0	0	0	Ranking Finals Semi-Finals
4	Switzerland	0	0	0	0	0	0	0	0	0	0	0	0	Ranking Finals Semi-Finals

First match(es) will be played: unknown. Source: Rugby Europe
Rules for classification:
If two teams have the same number of points the best ranked will be: 1) competition points; 2) match points difference; 3) match tries difference; 3) match points difference in all pool games; 4) tries for in all pool games; 5) match points for in all pool games.
If three or more teams have same number of points, the best ranked will be: 1) competition points; 2) tries for in all pool games; 3) match points for in all pool games.
Points were awarded to the teams as follows: Win – 4 points, Draw – 2 points, At least 3 more tries than opponent – 1 point, Loss within 7 points – 1 point

==== Week 1 ====
6 February 2027
12:30 CET (UTC+1)

Netherlands	v	Spain

NRCA Stadium, Amsterdam
Referee: TBA

7 February 2027
13:00 CET (UTC+1)

Switzerland	v	Portugal

Stade Municipal Yverdon, Yverdon-les-Bains
Referee: TBA

==== Week 2 ====
13 February 2027
13:00 CET (UTC+1)

Netherlands	v	Portugal

NRCA Stadium, Amsterdam
Referee: TBA

14 February 2027
12:30 CET (UTC+1)

Spain	v	Switzerland

Estadio Nacional Complutense, Madrid
Referee: TBA

==== Week 3 ====
21 February 2027
13:00 CET (UTC+1)

Switzerland	v	Netherlands

Stade Municipal Yverdon, Yverdon-les-Bains
Referee: TBA

21 February 2027
16:30 WET (UTC+0)

Portugal	v	Spain

TBA
Referee: TBA

== Ranking Finals ==
=== Semi-finals ===
6-7 March 2027
TBA

TBA	v	TBA

TBA
Referee: TBA

6-7 March 2027
TBA

TBA	v	TBA

TBA
Referee: TBA

=== Seventh-place final ===
14 March 2027
TBA

TBA	v	TBA

TBA
Referee: TBA

=== Fifth-place final ===
14 March 2027
TBA

TBA	v	TBA

TBA
Referee: TBA

== Grand Finals ==
=== Semi-finals ===
6-7 March 2027
TBA

TBA	v	TBA

TBA
Referee: TBA

6-7 March 2027
TBA

TBA	v	TBA

TBA
Referee: TBA

=== Bronze Final ===
14 March 2027
TBA

TBA	v	TBA

TBA
Referee: TBA

=== Final ===
14 March 2027
TBA

TBA	v	TBA

TBA
Referee: TBA

== Final standings ==
Advances to promotion/relegation play-off

Pos.	Team
1	TBA
2	TBA
3	TBA
4	TBA
5	TBA
6	TBA
7	TBA
8	TBA

== Relegation/promotion play-off ==
v

== International broadcasters ==
Country	Broadcaster	Summary
Belgium	LN24; AUVIO; VRT/Sporza	Belgium games shown live via LN24, AUVIO and VRT/Sporza.
Georgia	Rugby TV; Imedi TV	Georgia games shown live via Rugby TV and Imedi TV. Also Georgia games are streamed and free on Rugby TV Facebook page.
Netherlands	Ziggo Sport	Selected games live on Ziggo Sport.
Poland	TBA	Poland games shown live via.
Portugal	Sport TV	Portugal games shown live on Sport TV.
Romania	TVR Sport	Romania games shown live via TVR Sport.
Spain	Teledeporte; RTVE Play	Spain games shown live via Teledeporte and .RTVE Play digital platform.
Switzerland	RTS PLAY	Switzerland games shown live via RTS PLAY digital platform.
North America	FloRugby	All games available through streaming via FloSports.
Rest of the World	Rugby Europe; Rugbypass	All games available through streaming via Rugby Europe (registration required) and Rugbypass (registration required). Some games are streamed and free on Rugby Europe YouTube channel

== See also ==
- Rugby Europe International Championships
- Antim Cup
