= Sport in Gibraltar =

Sport plays a prominent role in Gibraltarian life. The range of sports practiced in the British overseas territory of Gibraltar is wide and varied in comparison to its size of less than 7 square kilometres (2.7 square miles). The Government of Gibraltar promotes sport within Gibraltar and supports many local sports associations financially. Gibraltar also competes in international sporting events, having competed in the Commonwealth Games since 1958, and in the biennial Island Games, which it hosted in 1995 and 2019.

== Government's role ==
The Ministry for Sport, headed by the Minister for Sport & Leisure, is responsible for sports policy matters and the provision of support to educational establishments and the governing bodies of sport in Gibraltar.

The Gibraltar Sports Advisory Council is set up to advise the Government of Gibraltar, through the Minister for Sport, on all matters relating to sport including:

- Capital expenditure priorities
- Allocation of grants to sporting societies
- Sports development
- International competitions
- Availability and use of sports facilities

== Sport facilities ==
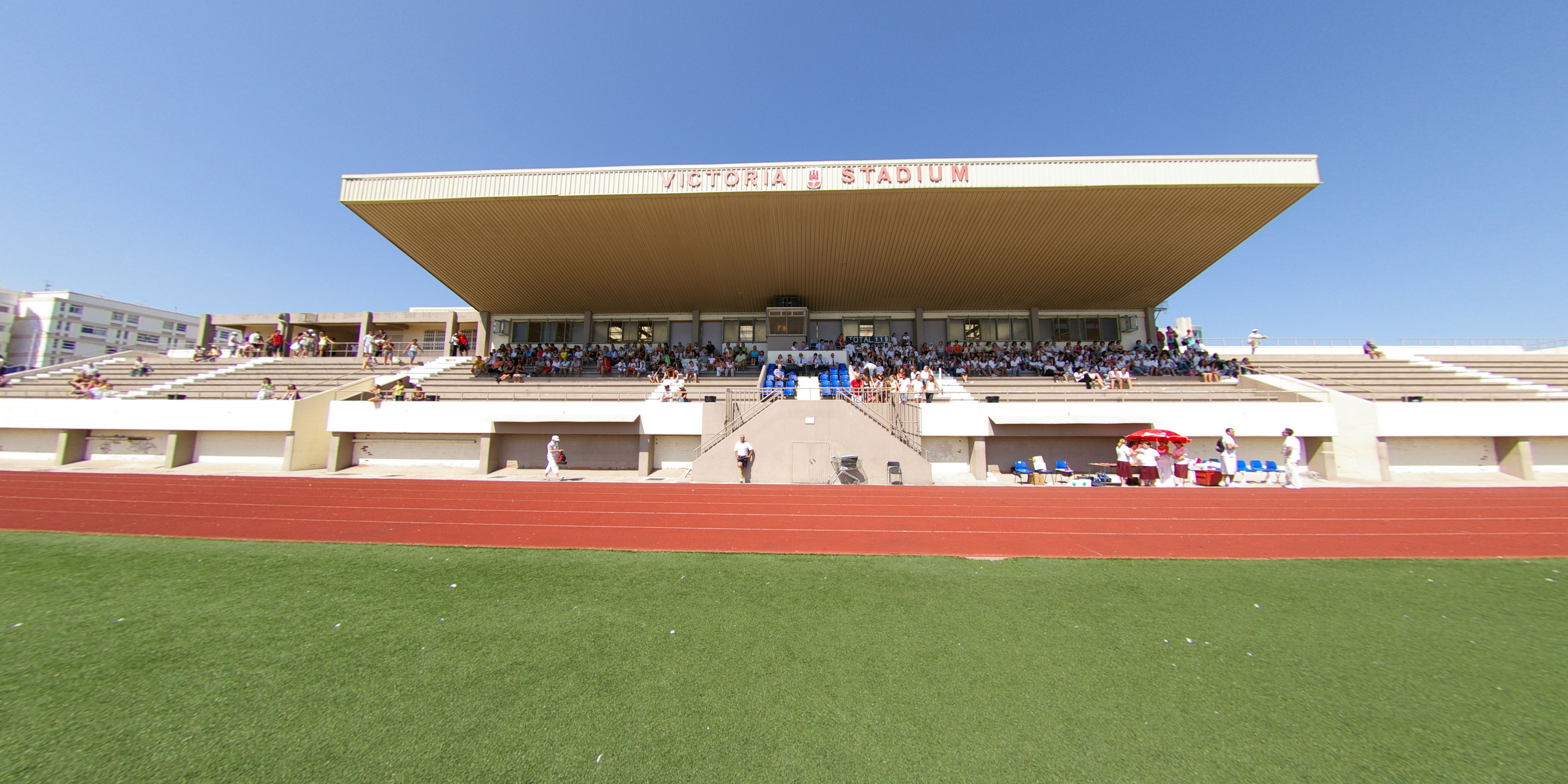
The western stands at the Victoria Stadium in Gibraltar

The Government recognises the benefits derived from the Gibraltarians' participation in sports and other recreational activities. Therefore, particular importance is given to the availability of facilities for the practice of these sports as well as making these available to anyone for booking allocations free of charge.

There are a large number of sport facilities in Gibraltar, of varying standards. These provide opportunities for locals and visitors alike to enjoy sport recreationally as well as professionally for the serious sport enthusiasts, where they can improve standards and have the opportunity to participate in local and international events.

The main sport facilities in Gibraltar are the multi-purpose Victoria Stadium and the Tercentenary Sports Hall. These include facilities such as artificial turf football pitches, water-based hockey fields, tennis and padel tennis courts, athletics fields, archery practice range, cricket fields, squash courts, golf practice range, climbing wall and multi-purpose sports halls for basketball, badminton, volleyball, netball, handball, five-a-side football, and martial arts among many others.

== Sports ==
In 2007, there were eighteen sports associations in Gibraltar officially recognised by their respective international governing bodies. Others, such as the Gibraltar National Olympic Committee, have applied for international recognition which are currently being considered.

=== Football ===
The Gibraltar Football Association applied for full membership of UEFA, but their bid was turned down in 2007 in a contentious decision in defiance of a previous Court of Arbitration for Sport ruling that held that GFA should be granted membership. UEFA's rejection was due to Spain's intense lobbying and vow to boycott any event involving Gibraltar. They were eventually granted membership in 2013.

=== Cricket ===
Gibraltar's national cricket team has featured in the top flight of the European Cricket Championship on four occasions, with its best finish, sixth place (out of eight teams), coming at the inaugural 1996 European Cricket Championship in Denmark. Gibraltar won Division Two at the Championships in 2000 and 2002, at a time when there was no promotion and relegation between divisions.

=== Rugby union ===
Rugby is played in Gibraltar under the auspices of the (English) Rugby Football Union, by both local teams such as Gibraltar Barbarians Rugby Club, and armed forces.

=== Basketball ===
Basketball in Gibraltar is managed by the Gibraltar Amateur Basketball Association (GABBA). Sponsored by Grind House, Men and Ladies GABBA teams play the senior basketball league in the neighbour Spanish province of Cádiz. Grind House GABBA won the 2007/08 female championship GABBA is a member of FIBA since 1985, and the men's team plays biennially the FIBA European Championship for Small Countries.

=== Darts ===
Darts enjoys widespread popularity in Gibraltar with regular participation in a league organised by the Gibraltar Darts Association, which is a full member of the World Darts Federation and regularly participates in European & World Championships. The Professional Darts Corporation is a regular visitor to Gibraltar, holding an annual tournament as one of the Players Championships.

In May 2010 Gibraltar was host nation for the Darts Mediterranean Cup. Six countries competed in the event; Cyprus, France, Gibraltar, Italy, Malta and Turkey. Gibraltar won the tournament, taking its first ever gold medal.

== Membership of international sports federations ==
Gibraltar has gained membership of the following federations:

Entity	Notes	Status	Date
Commonwealth Games Federation (CGF)	Gibraltar has competed in the Commonwealth Games since 1958.	Member	1958
European Championships	A team representing Gibraltar competes at the European Championships.	Member	2018
International Association Football Federation (FIFA)	The Gibraltar Football Association is a full member of FIFA and UEFA.	Member	2013
International Basketball Federation (FIBA)	The Gibraltar Amateur Basketball Association is a full member of FIBA and FIBA Europe.	Member	1985
International Island Games Association (IIGA)	Gibraltar is a member of the IIGA and participates in the Island Games.	Member	
World Darts Federation	The Gibraltar Darts Association is a full member of the WDF.	Member	
World Athletics (IAAF)	The Gibraltar Amateur Athletic Association is a full member of the IAAF, European Athletic Association and the Athletic Association of Small States of Europe.	Member	

== See also ==
- Gibraltarian records in athletics
- Culture of Gibraltar
- Sport in the United Kingdom
- Gibraltar Open - annual snooker event
- Gibraltar Chess Festival
