= List of New Zealand international netball players =

New Zealand netball internationals

The following is a list of notable New Zealand netball international players who have represented the national team in international tournaments such as the Commonwealth Games, the Netball World Cup, the World Games, the Taini Jamison Trophy, the Constellation Cup, the Netball Quad Series and in other senior test matches.

== Current squad ==
The current squad was selected for the 2025 Constellation Cup.

New Zealand roster
Players
Coaches

Name	Pos	DOB	Height	Club	Nat	Caps
Karin Burger (c)	WD, GD, GK	12 April 1993 (aged 32)	1.84 m (6 ft 0 in)	Mainland Tactix	(New Zealand)
Maddy Gordon	C, WA, WD	16 January 2000 (aged 25)	1.74 m (5 ft 9 in)	Central Pulse	(New Zealand)
Catherine Hall	GK,GD	16 December 2003 (aged 21)	1.91 m (6 ft 3 in)	Northern Mystics	(New Zealand)
Georgia Heffernan	GS, GA	7 October 1999 (aged 26)	1.81 m (5 ft 11 in)	Southern Steel	(New Zealand)
Kate Heffernan	WD, C, WA	7 October 1999 (aged 26)	1.81 m (5 ft 11 in)	Southern Steel	(New Zealand)
Kelly Jackson (vc)	GK, GD	22 October 1996 (aged 28)	1.92 m (6 ft 4 in)	Central Pulse	(New Zealand)
Paris Mason	GK, GD, WD	13 December 2002 (aged 22)	1.84 m (6 ft 0 in)	Central Pulse	(New Zealand)
Grace Nweke	GS	7 February 2002 (aged 23)	1.93 m (6 ft 4 in)	New South Wales Swifts	(Australia)
Kimiora Poi	C, WA	1 November 1997 (aged 27)	1.68 m (5 ft 6 in)	Southern Steel	(New Zealand)
Mila Reulu-Buchanan	C, WA	11 May 1998 (aged 27)	1.73 m (5 ft 8 in)	Northern Stars	(New Zealand)
Martina Salmon	GS, GA		1.90 m (6 ft 3 in)	Mainland Tactix	(New Zealand)
Carys Stythe	GD, GK	June 18, 2003 (aged 22)	1.92 m (6 ft 4 in)	Southern Steel	(New Zealand)
Elisapeta Toeava	WA, C	10 March 1994 (aged 31)	1.61 m (5 ft 3 in)	Northern Mystics	(New Zealand)
Amelia Walmsley	GS, GA	31 January 2004 (aged 21)	1.92 m (6 ft 4 in)	Central Pulse	(New Zealand)

Head coach

- Yvette McCausland-Durie

Assistant coach

- Liana Leota

Notes

- (c) – Captain
- (cc) – Co-captain
- (vc) – Vice-captain
- – Injury / maternity leave
- (TRP) – Temporary Replacement Player

== First Test ==
On 20 August 1938, New Zealand made their test debut in an away match against at Australia at Royal Park, Melbourne. Australia defeated New Zealand 40–11. This was the first netball Test between Australia and New Zealand. It was also the world's first international netball match. The following New Zealand netball internationals played in this first test.

Player	Appearances	Years
Margaret Matangi	1	1938
Jean Mitchell	1	1938
Ethel Divers	1	1938
Muriel Boswell	1	1938
Mary Martin	1	1938
Ethel Withell	1	1938
Jean Lomax	1	1938

== First home test ==
On 20 August 1948, New Zealand hosted their first home test against Australia at Forbury Park. Australia defeated New Zealand 27–16. The following New Zealand netball internationals played in this first home test.

Player	Appearances	Years
Oonah Shannahan	1	1948
Azalea Sinclair	1	1948
Dixie Cockerton	1	1948
Josie Yelas	3	1948
Alison Preston-Thomas	3	1948
Mary Sullivan	2	1948
Dell Bandeen	2	1948

== Captains ==
Years	Captains	Series/Tournaments
1938	Margaret Matangi	First Test against Australia
1948	Oonah Shannahan	First test home series against Australia
1948	Beverley Malcolm	Second test home series against Australia
1948	Betty Plant	Third test home series against Australia
1960	June Mariu	Away series against Australia
1963	Pamela Barham	1963 World Netball Tournament
1967	Judy Blair	1967 World Netball Tournament
1971	Joan Harnett	1971 World Netball Tournament
1975	Shirley Langrope	1975 World Netball Tournament
1979–1985	Lyn Gunson	1979 World Netball Tournament; 1983 World Netball Tournament; 1985 World Games
1987	Leigh Gibbs	1987 World Netball Tournament
1988	Tracey Fear	
1989–1991	Waimarama Taumaunu	1989 World Games; 1991 World Netball Championships
1990	Julie Townsend	1990 Commonwealth Games
1992	Ana Noovao	
1992–1993	Julie Carter	1993 World Games
1994–1995	Sandra Edge	1995 World Netball Championships
1996–1997	Lesley Rumball	
1997, 2000–2001	Bernice Mene	
1997–1999	Belinda Colling	1998 Commonwealth Games; 1999 World Netball Championships
2002, 2008	Julie Seymour	2002 Commonwealth Games; 2008 Taini Jamison Trophy Series
2002–2004	Anna Rowberry	2003 World Netball Championships
2004–2007	Adine Wilson	2006 Commonwealth Games; 2007 World Netball Championships
2008–2015	Casey Kopua (née Williams)	2009 Taini Jamison Trophy Series; 2010 Taini Jamison Trophy Series; 2010 Constellation Cup; 2011 Constellation Cup; 2010 Commonwealth Games; 2011 World Netball Championships; 2012 Netball Quad Series; 2013 Constellation Cup; 2013 Taini Jamison Trophy Series; 2014 Commonwealth Games; 2014 Constellation Cup; 2014 Taini Jamison Trophy Series; 2015 Taini Jamison Trophy Series; 2015 Netball World Cup; 2015 Constellation Cup
2011	Temepara George	2011 Constellation Cup
2008; 2011–2012; 2018–2019	Laura Langman	2008 Taini Jamison Trophy Series; 2011 Taini Jamison Trophy Series; 2011 Constellation Cup; 2012 Constellation Cup; 2018 Netball Quad Series (September); 2018 Constellation Cup; 2019 Netball Quad Series; 2019 Netball World Cup; 2019 Constellation Cup
2016–2018	Katrina Rore	2016 Netball Quad Series; 2016 Taini Jamison Trophy Series; 2016 Constellation Cup; 2017 Netball Quad Series (January/February); 2017 Netball Quad Series (August/September); 2017 Taini Jamison Trophy Series; 2017 Constellation Cup; 2018 Netball Quad Series (January); 2018 Taini Jamison Trophy Series; 2018 Commonwealth Games
2020–	Ameliaranne Ekenasio	2020 Netball Nations Cup; 2020 Taini Jamison Trophy Series; 2021 Constellation Cup; 2022 Taini Jamison Trophy Series; 2022 Constellation Cup; 2023 Netball Quad Series; 2023 Taini Jamison Trophy Series; 2023 Constellation Cup
2020–2021	Jane Watson	2021 Constellation Cup
2021	Gina Crampton	2021 Constellation Cup; 2021 Taini Jamison Trophy Series; 2022 Netball Quad Series; 2022 Commonwealth Games
2021	Sulu Fitzpatrick	2021 Taini Jamison Trophy Series
2024	Phoenix Karaka	2024 Netball Nations Cup
2024	Kate Heffernan	2024 Netball Nations Cup
2025	Karin Burger	2025 Taini Jamison Trophy Series; 2025 Constellation Cup; 2025 New Zealand netball tour of Great Britain
2025	Kelly Jackson	2025 Taini Jamison Trophy Series
2025	Grace Nweke	2025 Taini Jamison Trophy Series

== Most-capped internationals ==
=== Centurions ===
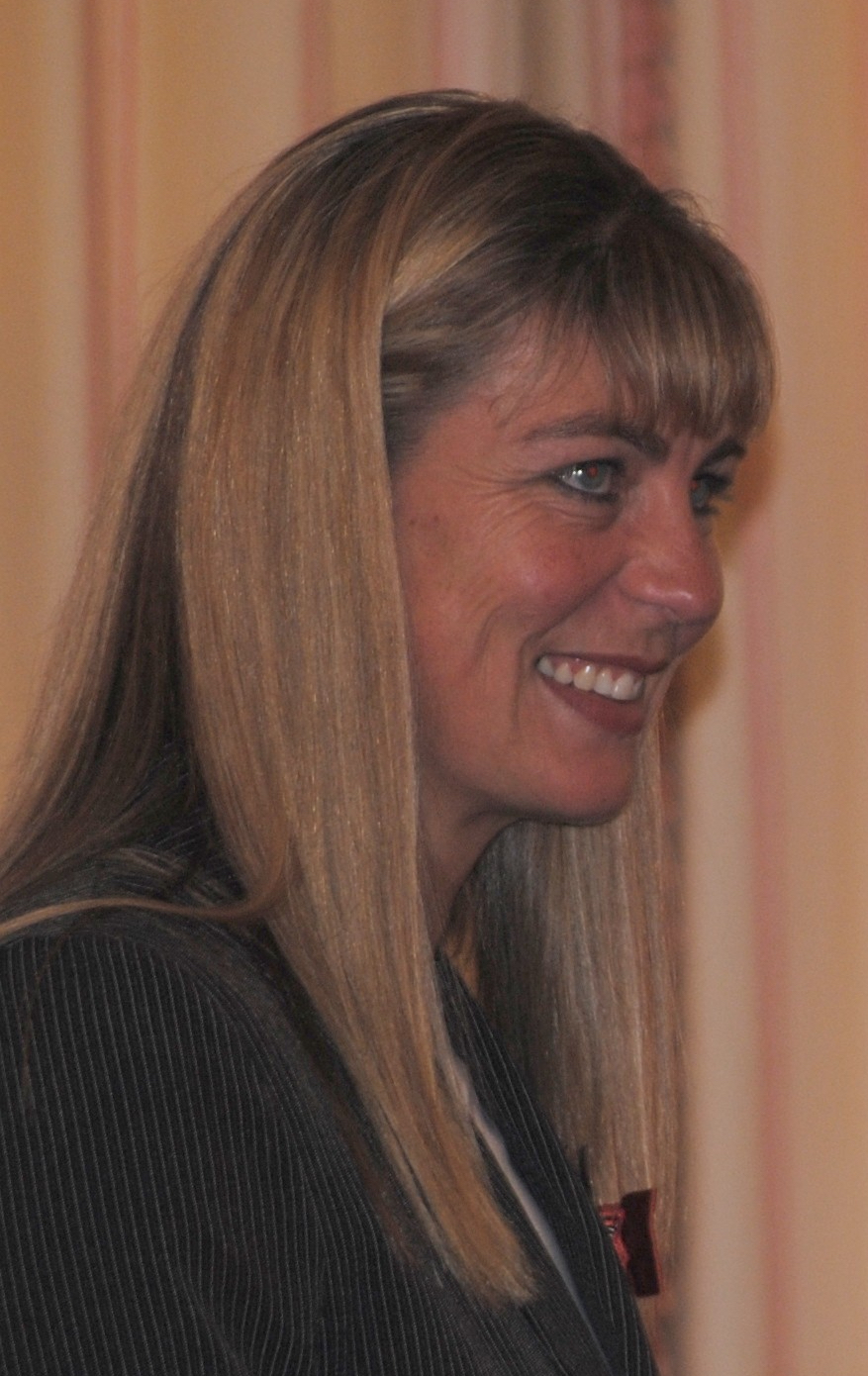
Irene van Dyk made 145 appearances for New Zealand between 2000 and 2014. Between 1994 and 1999 she made 72 appearances for South Africa.

Player	Appearances	Years
Laura Langman	163	2005–2020
Maria Folau	150	2005–2019
Irene van Dyk	145	2000–2014
Katrina Rore	137	2008–
Casey Kopua (née Williams)	135	2005–2019
Lesley Rumball	110	1994–2005
Leana de Bruin	104	2003–2016

=== 70+ Appearances ===
Player	Appearances	Years
Belinda Colling	92	1996–2006
Anna Stanley	92	1994–2007
Joline Henry	91	2003–2014
Temepara Bailey	89	1996–2011
Sandra Edge	89	1985–1995
Julie Seymour	89	1994–2009
Anna Harrison	88	2002–2017
Shannon Saunders	85	2013–
Adine Wilson	79	1999–2006
Waimarama Taumaunu	77	1981–1991
Bernice Mene	76	1992–2001
Bailey Mes	72	2012–
Lyn Gunson	70	1974–1985

== New Zealand Sports Hall of Fame ==
The following New Zealand netball internationals have been inducted into the New Zealand Sports Hall of Fame.

Inducted	Player	Appearances	Years
1990	Joan Harnett	26	1963–1971
1993	Lois Muir	13	1960–1964
1996	Waimarama Taumaunu	77	1981–1991
1999	Rita Fatialofa	45	1982–1989
2001	Sandra Edge	89	1985–1995
2016	Lesley Rumball	110	1994–2005

== National team head coaches ==
The following New Zealand netball internationals subsequently served as head coach of the national team.

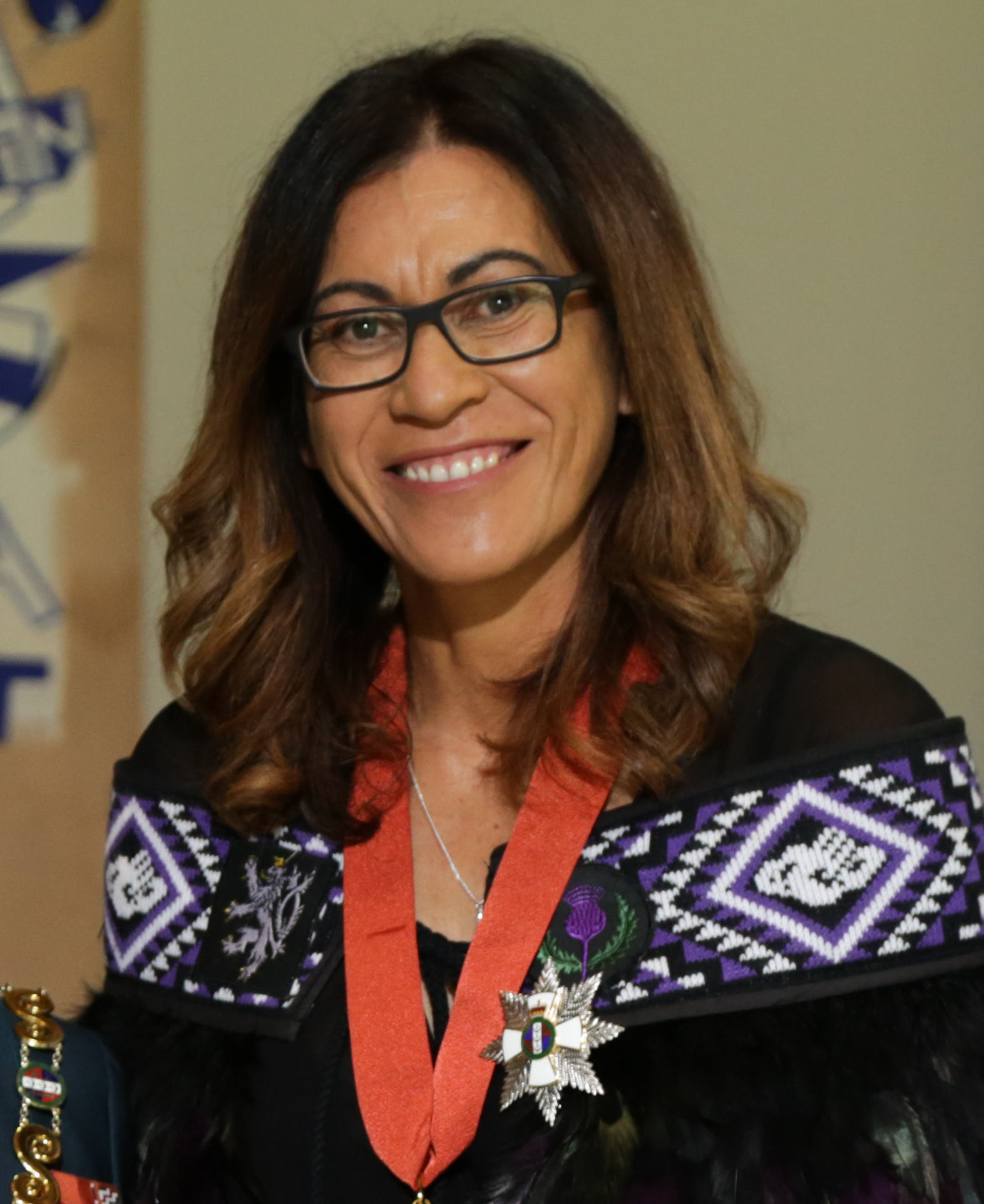
Current head coach, Noeline Taurua, made 34 appearances as a player for New Zealand between 1994 and 1999.

Name	Player apps	Player years	Coach years
Dixie Cockerton	1	1948	1960–1963
Lois Muir	13	1960–1964	1974–1988
Lyn Gunson	70	1974–1985	1989–1993
Leigh Gibbs	61	1978–1987	1994–1997
Yvonne Willering	57	1974–1983	1997–2001
Ruth Aitken	3	1979	2002–2011
Waimarama Taumaunu	77	1981–1991	2011–2015
Noeline Taurua	34	1994–1999	2018–

== Gold medalists ==
=== Netball World Cup ===
==== 1967 ====
The following New Zealand netball internationals were members of the squad that won the 1967 World Netball Tournament. In 1996 they were also inducted into the New Zealand Sports Hall of Fame.

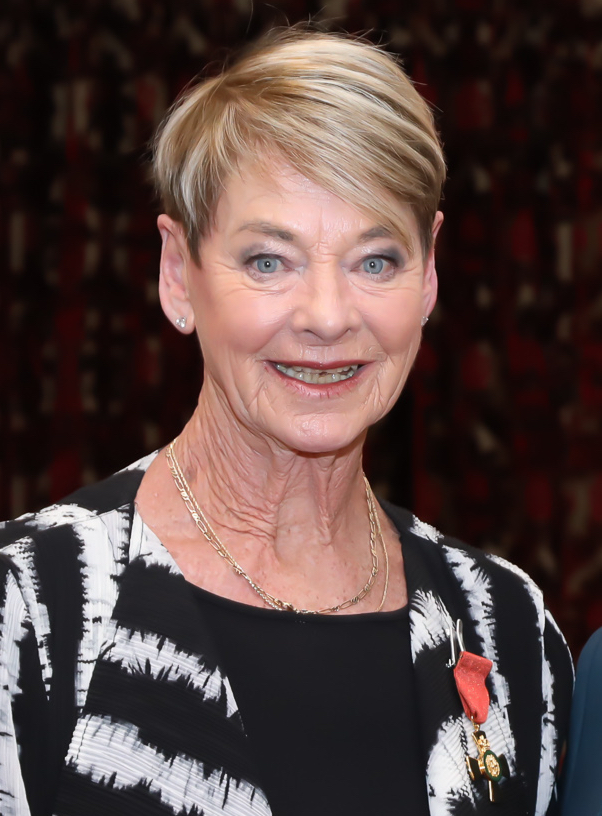
Joan Harnett, 1963–1971, 26 appearances. In 1990 Harnett was inducted into the New Zealand Sports Hall of Fame.

Player	Appearances	Years
Judy Blair	19	1960–1967
Ann Boelee	6	1967
Margaret Gardiner	1	1967
Pam Hamilton	8	1967
Joan Harnett	26	1963–1971
Billie Irwin	7	1967
Sandra James	2	1967
Elizabeth Rowley	1	1967
Mirth Solomon	9	1963–1967
Tilly Vercoe	19	1967–1971

==== 1979 ====
The following New Zealand netball internationals were members of the New Zealand squad that shared the gold medal at the 1979 World Netball Tournament with Australia and Trinidad and Tobago.

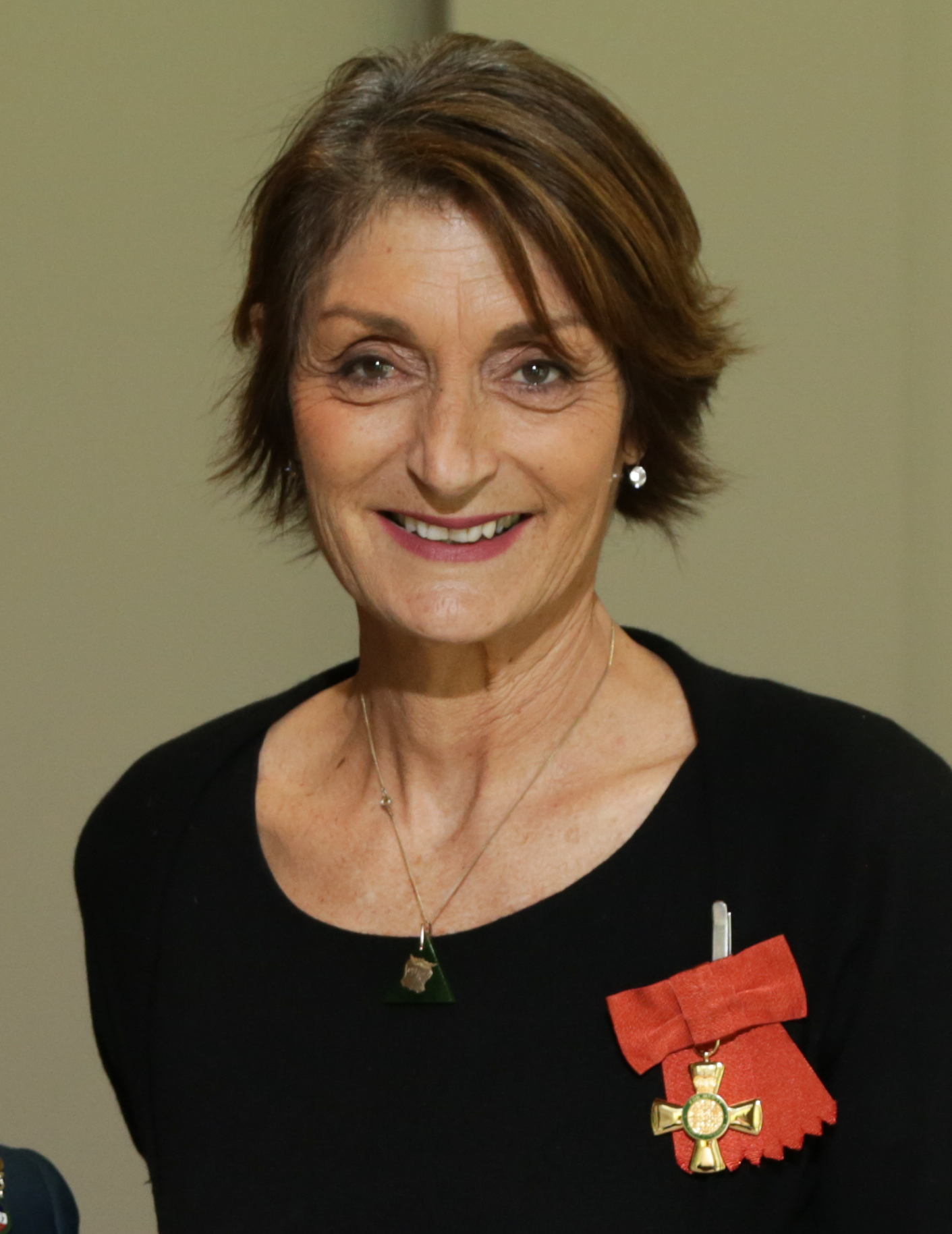
Margaret Forsyth, 1979–1987, 64 appearances

Player	Appearances	Years
Maxine Blomquist	31	1974–1982
Ruth Fathers	3	1979
Margaret Forsyth	64	1979–1987
Lyn Parker	70	1974–1985
Janice Henderson	6	1979–1981
Margharet Kamana	68	1978–1987
Geane Katae	10	1979–1982
Leigh Mills	61	1978–1987
Millie Munro	41	1974–1982
Christine Pietzner	21	1974–1979
Lynn Proudlove	6	1979–1983
Yvonne Willering	57	1974–1983

==== 1987 ====
The following New Zealand netball internationals were members of the squad that won the 1987 World Netball Tournament. In 1996 they were also inducted into the New Zealand Sports Hall of Fame.

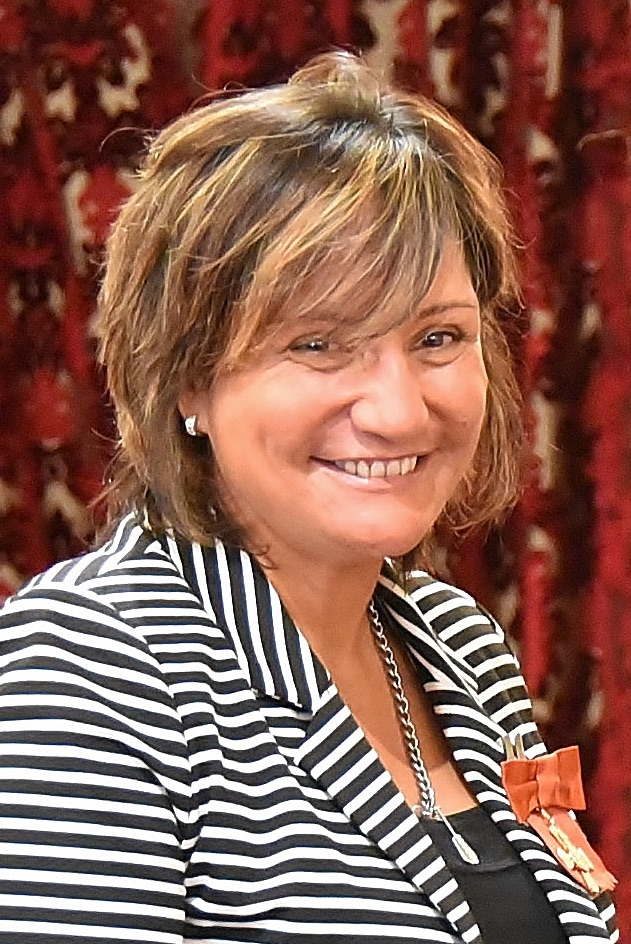
Waimarama Taumaunu, 1981–1991, 77 appearances

Player	Appearances	Years
Tracy Eyrl	58	1986–1995
Rita Fatialofa	45	1982–1989
Tracey Fear	63	1982–1988
Margaret Forsyth	64	1979–1987
Leigh Gibbs	61	1978–1987
Annette Heffernan	9	1985–1990
Sandra Mallet	89	1985–1995
Margharet Matenga	68	1978–1987
Angela Pule	1	1987
Joan Solia	35	1986–1993
Waimarama Taumaunu	77	1981–1991
Julie Townsend	37	1985–1990

==== 2003 ====
The following New Zealand netball internationals were members of the squad that won the 2003 World Netball Championships. At the 2003 Halberg Awards, the New Zealand national netball team won both the main award were named Team of the Year. Their head coach, Ruth Aitken, was named Coach of the Year and Irene van Dyk was named Sportswoman of the Year.

Player	Appearances	Years
Sheryl Clarke	62	1997–2009
Belinda Colling	92	1996–2006
Tania Dalton	12	1996–2007
Vilimaina Davu	60	2000–2006
Leana du Plooy	104	2003–2016
Temepara George	89	1996–2011
Lesley Nicol	110	1994–2005
Anna Rowberry	92	1994–2007
Anna Scarlett	88	2002–2017
Jodi Te Huna	61	2002–2015
Irene van Dyk	145	2000–2014
Adine Wilson	79	1999–2006

==== 2019 ====
The following New Zealand netball internationals were members of the squad that won the 2019 Netball World Cup. At the 2019 Halberg Awards, the New Zealand national netball team won both the Halberg Award Supreme and were named Team of the Year. Winning the 2019 Netball World Cup was declared New Zealand's Favourite Sport Moment and their head coach, Noeline Taurua, was named Coach of the Year. The team was also awarded the 2019 Lonsdale Cup.

Player	Appearances	Years
Maria Folau	150	2005–2019
Laura Langman	163	2005–2020
Ameliaranne Ekenasio	47	2014–
Gina Crampton	52	2016–
Bailey Mes	72	2012–
Casey Kopua	135	2005–2019
Jane Watson	52	2016–
Shannon Saunders	85	2013–
Karin Burger	33	2018–
Phoenix Karaka	34	2014–
Katrina Rore	137	2008–
Te Paea Selby-Rickit	48	2016–

=== World Games ===
==== 1985 ====
The following New Zealand netball internationals were members of the squad that won the gold medal at the 1985 World Games.

Player	Appearances	Years
Rita Fatialofa	45	1982–1989
Tracey Fear	63	1982–1988
Margaret Forsyth	64	1979–1987
Leigh Gibbs	61	1978–1987
Annette Heffernan	9	1985–1990
Karen Henrikson	16	1985–1986
Sandra Mallet	89	1985–1995
Margharet Matenga	68	1978–1987
Rhonda Meads	20	1982–1985
Lyn Parker	70	1974–1985
Waimarama Taumaunu	77	1981–1991
Julie Townsend	37	1985–1990

==== 1989 ====
The following New Zealand netball internationals were members of the squad that won the gold medal at the 1989 World Games. At the 1989 Halberg Awards, the New Zealand national netball team was named Team of the Year and their head coach, Lyn Parker, was named Coach of the Year.

Player	Appearances	Years
Sharon Burridge	19	1988–1995
Julie Carter	50	1986–1993
Robin Dillimore	32	1989–1994
Sandra Edge	89	1985–1995
Tracy Eyrl-Shortland	58	1986–1995
Rita Fatialofa	45	1982–1989
Annette Heffernan	9	1985–1990
April Ieremia	9	1988–1992
Ana Noovao	23	1989–1992
Waimarama Taumaunu	77	1981–1991
Julie Townsend	37	1985–1990
Louisa Wall	28	1989–1992

=== Commonwealth Games ===
==== 2006 ====
The following New Zealand netball internationals were members of the squad that won the gold medal at the 2006 Commonwealth Games.

Player	Appearances	Years
Leana de Bruin	104	2003–2016
Belinda Colling	92	1996–2006
Vilimaina Davu	60	2000–2006
Temepara George	89	1996–2011
Laura Langman	163	2005–2020
Jessica Tuki	3	2006
Anna Rowberry	92	1994–2007
Anna Scarlett	88	2002–2017
Maria Tutaia	150	2005–2019
Irene van Dyk	145	2000–2014
Casey Williams	135	2005–2019
Adine Wilson	79	1999–2006

==== 2010 ====
The following New Zealand netball internationals were members of the squad that won the gold medal at the 2010 Commonwealth Games. The team was also awarded the 2010 Lonsdale Cup.

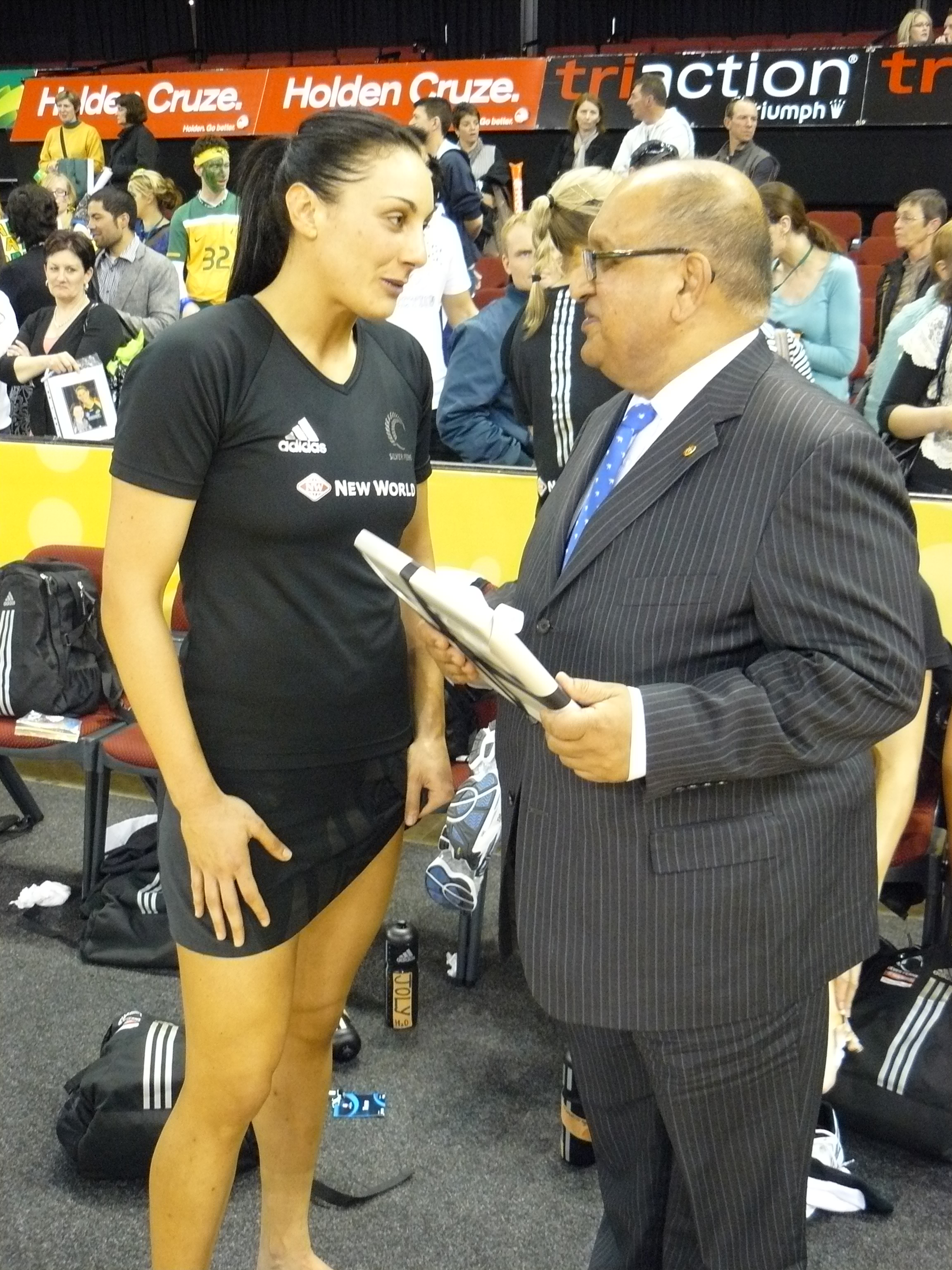
29 August 2010; The Governor-General of New Zealand, Rt Hon Sir Anand Satyanand, talks to New Zealand's Joline Henry during the 2010 Constellation Cup series.

Player	Appearances	Years
Liana Leota	41	2008–2015
Leana de Bruin	104	2003–2016
Temepara George	89	1996–2011
Katrina Grant	137	2008–
Joline Henry	91	2003–2014
Laura Langman	163	2005–2020
Grace Rasmussen	63	2010–
Anna Scarlett	88	2002–2017
Maria Tutaia	150	2005–2019
Irene van Dyk	145	2000–2014
Casey Williams	135	2005–2019
Daneka Wipiiti	18	2002–2011

== Top 25 of the Last 25 ==
In April 2022 to celebrate twenty five years of elite netball leagues in New Zealand, a panel of former coaches and players, selected the top twenty five players that, between 1998 and 2022, had played in the National Bank Cup, the ANZ Championship and the ANZ Premiership. All twenty five were New Zealand internationals.

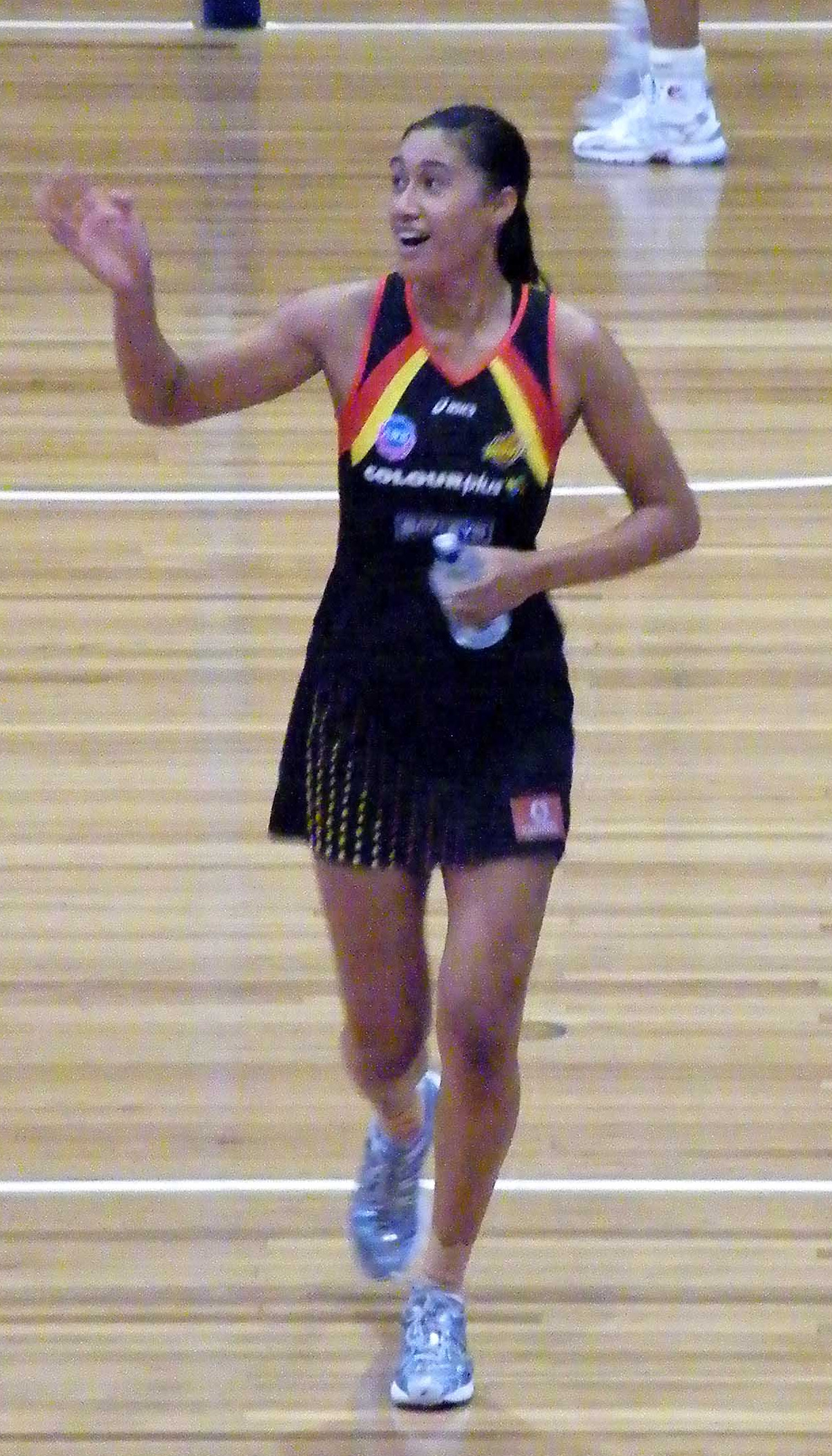
Maria Folau playing for Waikato Bay of Plenty Magic

Player	Appearances	Years
Temepara Bailey	89	1996–2011
Belinda Colling	92	1996–2006
Vilimaina Davu	60	2000–2006
Leana de Bruin	104	2003–2016
Ameliaranne Ekenasio	47	2014–
Sulu Fitzpatrick	27	2011–2023
Maria Folau	150	2005–2019
Wendy Frew	1	2008
Anna Harrison	88	2002–2017
Joline Johansson	91	2003–2014
Casey Kopua	135	2005–2019
Laura Langman	163	2005–2020
Bernice Mene	76	1992–2001
Katrina Rore	137	2008–
Lesley Rumball	110	1994–2005
Sheryl Scanlan	62	1997–2009
Te Huinga Reo Selby-Rickit	2	2013
Julie Seymour	89	1994–2009
Anna Stanley	92	1994–2007
Cathrine Tuivaiti	24	2011–2014
Linda Vagana	64	1993–2002
Irene van Dyk	145	2000–2014
Jane Watson	52	2016–
Donna Wilkins	56	1996–2002
Adine Wilson	79	1999–2006

== New Zealand Netball Awards ==
=== Netball New Zealand 75th Anniversary Dream Team ===
In June 2000, as part of their 75th anniversary celebration's, Netball New Zealand named a New Zealand Dream Team.

Starting Seven

Position	Player	Appearances	Years
GS	Margharet Matenga	1	1938
GA	Joan Harnett	26	1963–1971
WA	Rita Fatialofa	45	1982–1989
C	Sandra Edge	89	1985–1995
WD	Lyn Gunson	70	1974–1985
GD	Yvonne Willering	57	1974–1983
GK	Tracey Fear	63	1982–1988

Bench

Position	Player	Appearances	Years
GA, GS, WA	Judy Blair	19	1960–1967
GA	Margaret Forsyth	64	1979–1987
WD	Leigh Gibbs	61	1978–1987
WA, C, WD	Shirley Langrope	19	1969–1975
GK	Bernice Mene	76	1992–2001

=== Dame Lois Muir Supreme Award ===
The Dame Lois Muir Supreme Award recognises the best New Zealand netball internationals across all elite competitions and international campaigns. The award is named after Dame Lois Muir DNZM OBE. It is regarded as the highest individual accolade a New Zealand netballer can achieve.

Year	Winner
2015	Laura Langman
2016	Laura Langman
2019	Laura Langman
2021	Sulu Fitzpatrick
2022	Grace Nweke ^{(Note 1)}
2022	Kelly Jury ^{(Note 1)}

Notes

- ^1 Grace Nweke and Kelly Jury shared 2022 award.

=== Silver Ferns Player of the Year ===
The Silver Ferns Player of the Year is awarded to the New Zealand netball international player who has displayed consistent, outstanding performances throughout the international season.

Year	Winner
2015	Laura Langman
2016	Laura Langman
2019	Ameliaranne Ekenasio
2021	Samantha Winders
2022	Grace Nweke

== Triple internationals ==
=== Netball ===
Player	NZ Appearances	Years	Second team	Appearances	Years	Third team	Appearances	Years
Cathrine Tuivaiti	24	2011–2014	Samoa	30	2005–2007	Tonga		2023

== Dual internationals ==
=== Netball ===
The following New Zealand netball internationals also represented other national teams in international netball.

Player	NZ Appearances	Years	Other team	Appearances	Years
Leana de Bruin	104	2003–2016	South Africa	34	??
Vilimaina Davu	60	2000–2006	Fiji	57?	1993–1999, 2007
Irene van Dyk	145	2000–2014	South Africa	72	1994–2000
Ameliaranne Ekenasio	53	2014–	Australia	^{(Note 2)}	2010–2011
Kristiana Manu'a	^{(Note 3)}	2022	Australia	2	2016
Lynne Macdonald	2	1969	England		1975 ?
Jamie-Lee Price	^{(Note 4)}	2014	Australia	30	2018–
Rachel Rasmussen	^{(Note 5)}	2010	Samoa		2003, 2019
Leilani Read	9	1993–1996	Samoa		1995
Sheryl Clarke	62	1997–2009	Samoa	10	1996–1999
Courtney Tairi	3	2013	Australia	^{(Note 6)}	2008–2009
Lorna Suafoa	10	1998–1999	Samoa		
Linda Vagana	64	1993–2002	Samoa		2003

Notes

- ^2 Ameliaranne Ekenasio represented Australia at under-19 and under-21 levels.
- ^3 Kristiana Manu'a represented New Zealand at the 2022 Fast5 Netball World Series.
- ^4 Jamie-Lee Price represented New Zealand at secondary school level and under-21 levels and at the 2014 Fast5 Netball World Series.
- ^5 Rachel Rasmussen represented New Zealand at the 2010 World Netball Series.
- ^6 Courtney Tairi represented Australia at under-21 level.

=== Netball and Basketball ===
The following New Zealand netball internationals also played for the New Zealand women's national basketball team.

Player	Netball Apps	Years	Basketball Apps	Years
Sheryl Burns	8	1992–1993		1985–1991, 1995
Belinda Colling	92	1996–2006	48	2000
Lynne Macdonald	2	1969	10	
Lois Muir	13	1960–1964	17	1952–1962
Jessica Tuki	3	2006		2014
Donna Wilkins	56	1996–2002	95	2000–2006
Maia Wilson	52	2016–	6	2014
Parris Mason	5	2024–	8	2022-2023

=== Netball and Rugby Union ===
The following New Zealand netball internationals also played for the New Zealand women's national rugby union team.

Player	Netball Apps	Years	Rugby Apps	Years
Louisa Wall	28	1989–1992	15	1994–1999

=== Netball and Cricket ===
The following New Zealand netball internationals also played for the New Zealand women's national cricket team.

Player	Netball Apps	Years	Cricket Apps	Years
Kate Heffernan	39	2022-	2	2018

=== Netball and Softball ===
The following New Zealand netball internationals also played for the New Zealand women's national softball team.

Player	Netball Apps	Years	Softball Apps	Years
Rita Fatialofa	45	1982 - 1983, 1985 - 1989	43	1982-1986
Wendy Frew	1	2008		2003

== Family ==
=== Sisters ===
Sister 1	Apps	Years	Sister 2	Apps	Years
Maxine Blomquist	31	1974–1982	Annette Heffernan	9	1985–1990
Te Huinga Reo Selby-Rickit	2	2013	Te Paea Selby-Rickit	48	2016–
Kate Heffernan	34	2022–	Georgia Heffernan	3	2024–

=== Mothers and daughters ===
Mother	Apps	Years	Daughter	Apps	Years
Judy Blair	19	1960–1967	Belinda Charteris	53	1994–2002
Brenda Rowberry	12	1969–1971	Anna Stanley	92	1994–2007
Annette Heffernan	9	1985–1990	Kate Heffernan	34	2022–
Waimarama Taumaunu	77	1981–1991	Tiana Metuarau	6	2021–
Annette Heffernan	9	1985–1990	Georgia Heffernan	3	2024–
