= Netball at the 1985 World Games =

International netball tournament

Tournament details
- Host country: England
- City: London
- Venue: Crystal Palace National Sports Centre
- Dates: 2–4 August 1985
- Teams: 6

Final positions
- Champions: New Zealand
- Runners-up: Australia
- Third place: Jamaica

The Netball tournament at the 1985 World Games was played at London's Crystal Palace National Sports Centre from 2 August to 4 August 1985. It was the first time netball was played at a World Games. It featured England, Australia, Jamaica, New Zealand, Northern Ireland and Scotland. With a team coached by Lois Muir and captained by Lyn Parker, New Zealand won the tournament, winning all five matches they played.

== Head coaches and captains ==
Team	Head coach	Captain
Australia	Pamela Barham	Anne Sargeant
England	Heather Crouch	Jillean Hipsey
Jamaica		
New Zealand	Lois Muir	Lyn Parker
Northern Ireland		
Scotland		

== Matches ==
The tournament featured six teams – England, Australia, Jamaica, New Zealand, Northern Ireland and Scotland. Northern Ireland were late replacements for Trinidad and Tobago.

2 August 1985	New Zealand	35–31	Jamaica

2 August 1985	England	27–34	Australia

2 August 1985	Scotland	32–17	Northern Ireland

2 August 1985	England	29–34	New Zealand

2 August 1985	Australia	44–38	Jamaica

3 August 1985	New Zealand	35–31	Scotland

3 August 1985	Australia	39–20	Jamaica

3 August 1985	England	29–33	Jamaica

3 August 1985	England	37–12	Scotland

4 August 1985	New Zealand	52–15	Northern Ireland

4 August 1985	Australia	58–18	Scotland

4 August 1985	New Zealand	39–37	Australia

4 August 1985	Jamaica	40–27	Scotland

August 1985	Jamaica	v	Northern Ireland

August 1985	England	40–13	Northern Ireland

== Table ==
Pos	Team	P	W	D	L	GF	GA	GD	Pts
1	New Zealand	5	5	0	0	199	120	+79	10
2	Australia	5	4	0	1	212	142	+70	8
3	Jamaica	5							
4	England	5	2	0	3	162	126	+36	4
5	Scotland	5	1	0	4	120	187	-67	2
6	Northern Ireland	5							

== Final Placings ==
Rank	Team
1st place, gold medalist(s)	New Zealand
2nd place, silver medalist(s)	Australia
3rd place, bronze medalist(s)	Jamaica
4	England
5	Scotland
6	Northern Ireland

== Medalists ==
Gold	Silver	Bronze
New Zealand; Coach: Lois Muir	Australia; Coach: Pamela Barham	Jamaica; Coach:
Rita Fatialofa; Tracey Fear; Margaret Forsyth; Leigh Gibbs; Annette Heffernan; Karen Henrikson; Sandra Mallet; Margharet Matenga; Rhonda Meads; Lyn Parker (c); Waimarama Taumaunu; Julie Townsend	Anne Sargeant (c); Julie Francou (vc); Dianne Cleveland; Michelle Fielke; Monica Pukallis; Keeley Devery; Roselee Jencke; Jane Searle; Sue Hawkins; Vicki Wilson; Debbie Johnson	Avadne Anglin; Valerie Balke; Pauline Burton; Janet Guy; Janet Johnson; Brenda Khouri; Marva Lindsay; Patricia McDonald; Joan Oldacre; Karlene Roese; Sharon Taylor
