= Julie Coney =

New Zealand netball player and TV commentator

Julie Coney MBE
Personal information
- Full name: Julie-Ann Coney (Née: Townsend)
- Born: 4 April 1960 (age 66)
- Height: 1.75 m (5 ft 9 in)
- Spouse: Jeremy Coney (div.)

Netball career
- Playing positions: GD, WD
Years	National team	Caps
1985–1990	New Zealand	37
Medal record
Representing New Zealand
World Netball Tournament
Gold medal – first place	1987 Glasgow	Tournament

Julie-Ann Coney MBE (née Townsend; born 4 April 1960) is a former netball player who played for New Zealand on 37 occasions and was its 14th captain. She later became a television commentator on netball matches and a corporate hospitality organizer for sporting events.

== Netball career ==
Coney was born Julie-Ann Townsend on 4 April 1960 in Dunedin, and was educated at Dunstan High School in Alexandra. Moving to Auckland, as Julie Townsend she played netball for College Rifles and also for Auckland. Her first game for the Silver Ferns, the New Zealand national netball team, was in July 1985. Although she had started her career playing in the Goal defence (GD) position, she was not considered tall enough for the position at international level and for most of her time as a Silver Fern she played in the Wing defence (WD) position. Coney played in the 1985 World Games, when New Zealand won the gold medal. She was a member of the team in the 1987 World Netball Tournament, often sharing WD responsibilities with the captain Leigh Gibbs. New Zealand, coached by Lois Muir, won the gold medal at the tournament. Coney was in the team that won the 1989 World Games. She was captain of the Silver Ferns in the 1990 Commonwealth Games when the team lost a demonstration match against Australia.

== Later career ==
Coney married and subsequently divorced Jeremy Coney, a former New Zealand cricketer who moved to England and became a cricket commentator. In 1985 she started work as a hospitality and events manager. From 1992, she also became a television commentator on netball matches for Television New Zealand (TVNZ) but lost her job at the end of 2010 when TVNZ lost to Sky New Zealand the contract to broadcast netball. She has also been in several other TV programmes. In 2003 she joined with the former All Black, Joe Stanley, to establish a corporate hospitality company. In 2021 she joined Netball New Zealand as a commercial relationships manager.

== Honours ==
In the 1991 New Year Honours, Townsend was appointed a Member of the Order of the British Empire, for services to netball.
