= 1987 World Netball Tournament =

International netball tournament hosted by Scotland

Tournament details
- Host country: Scotland
- City: Glasgow
- Venue: Crownpoint Sports Park
- Dates: 16–28 August 1987
- Teams: 17

Final positions
- Champions: New Zealand (3rd title)
- Runners-up: Trinidad and Tobago; Australia

Tournament statistics
- Matches played: 92

The 1987 World Netball Tournament was the seventh Netball World Cup. It featured 17 teams playing a series of netball test matches in Glasgow in August 1987. With a team coached by Lois Muir and captained by Leigh Gibbs, New Zealand won the tournament. New Zealand were dominant in group play, winning all eight matches. That saw them advance to the 1st–4th classification round with Australia, England and Trinidad and Tobago. New Zealand were the only side to win all three games, which confirmed their third world title. Australia and Trinidad and Tobago shared second place. In 1996 the New Zealand winning team were inducted into the New Zealand Sports Hall of Fame. In New Zealand, matches were broadcast live on Television New Zealand.

== Teams, head coaches and captains ==
Team	Head coach	Captain
Australia	Wilma Shakespear	Anne Sargeant
Barbados	Anna Shepherd	Denise Morgan
Bermuda	Carol Bean	
Canada	Ann Willcocks	
Cook Islands		
England	Heather Crouch	Jillean Hipsey
Fiji		
Republic of Ireland		Kathleen Dunleavy
Jamaica	Barbara Robinson Sinclair	Janet Johnson
Malaysia		Carmen Edmonds
New Zealand	Lois Muir	Leigh Gibbs
Northern Ireland	Mary Hicks	Elizabeth Rodgers
Papua New Guinea	Janice Mary Waddy	
Scotland	Agnes O'Brien	Susan Mosher (McCafferty)
Sri Lanka		Yasa Ramachandra
Trinidad and Tobago	Enid Browne; Jean Pierre	Jennifer Frank ?
Wales	Beverley Ryan	Maria Gornell

== Milestones ==
- Trinidad and Tobago's Jean Pierre kept up her 100% appearance at the tournament. Between 1963 and 1979, she played for Trinidad and Tobago at five Netball World Cups. In 1983 and 1987, she then coached Trinidad and Tobago.

== Match officials ==
Umpire	Association
Colleen Bond	New Zealand
Maureen Boyle	Australia
Cheryl Danson	England
Dawn Jones	New Zealand
Deborah Lynch	Barbados
Yvette Smith	Jamaica
Anne Roberts	Wales
Avril Roper	Wales
Anne Marie Daly	Scotland
Joyce Wheeler	England

== Group A ==
=== Matches ===
Round 1

Saturday, 15 August	Fiji	51–27	Papua New Guinea

Sunday, 16 August	Northern Ireland	52–26	Sri Lanka

Sunday, 16 August	Trinidad and Tobago	48–10	Canada

Round 2

Monday, 17 August	Jamaica	66–36	Canada

Monday, 17 August	Fiji	47–34	Northern Ireland

Monday, 17 August	Australia	90–17	Papua New Guinea

Round 3

Tuesday, 18 August	Jamaica	bt	Sri Lanka

Tuesday, 18 August	Trinidad and Tobago	bt	Papua New Guinea

Tuesday, 18 August	Northern Ireland	bt	Canada

Round 4

Tuesday, 18 August	Australia	86–30	Fiji

Tuesday, 18 August	Trinidad and Tobago	74–12	Sri Lanka

Round 5

Thursday, 20 August	Trinidad and Tobago	54–22	Fiji

Thursday, 20 August	Australia	85–3	Sri Lanka

Thursday, 20 August	Jamaica	49–18	Papua New Guinea

Round 6

Friday, 21 August	Northern Ireland	45–36	Papua New Guinea

Friday, 21 August	Australia	63–15	Canada

Friday, 21 August	Jamaica	76–46	Fiji

Round 7

Saturday, 22 August	Trinidad and Tobago	50–50	Jamaica

Saturday, 22 August	Australia	69–9	Northern Ireland

Saturday, 22 August	Fiji	55–34	Sri Lanka

Saturday, 22 August	Canada	41–35	Papua New Guinea

Round 8

Sunday, 23 August	Trinidad and Tobago	73–23	Northern Ireland

Monday, 24 August	Australia	64–54	Jamaica

Monday, 24 August	Fiji	54–30	Canada

Monday, 24 August	Papua New Guinea	42–33	Sri Lanka

Round 9

Tuesday, 25 August	Trinidad and Tobago	51–50	Australia

Tuesday, 25 August	Jamaica	65–22	Northern Ireland

Tuesday, 25 August	Canada	55–25	Sri Lanka

=== Table ===
Pos	Team	Pld	W	D	L	GF	GA	GD	Pts
1	Trinidad and Tobago	7	6	1	0	350	167	+183	13
2	Australia	7	6	0	1	517	179	+338	12
3	Jamaica	7	5	1	1	360	236	+124	11
4	Fiji	7	4	0	3	254	314	–60	8
5	Northern Ireland	7	3	0	4	185	316	–131	6
6	Canada	7	2	0	5	187	291	–104	4
7	Papua New Guinea	7	1	0	6	148	258	–110	2
8	Sri Lanka	7	0	0	7	107	321	–214	0

Qualified for 1st–4th Classification
Qualified for 5th–8th Classification
Qualified for 9th–12th Classification
Qualified for 13th–17th Classification

Notes

- ^1 This table is not 100% accurate as some scores are missing.

== Group B ==
=== Matches ===
Round 1

Saturday, 15 August	Scotland	46–26	Republic of Ireland

Sunday, 16 August	New Zealand	53–28	Barbados

Sunday, 16 August	England	56–18	Malaysia

Sunday, 16 August	Bermuda	28–27	Wales

Round 2

Monday, 17 August	New Zealand	78–27	Cook Islands

Monday, 17 August	England	46–36	Barbados

Monday, 17 August	Scotland	39–26	Malaysia

Monday, 17 August	Bermuda	35–35	Republic of Ireland

Round 3

Tuesday, 18 August	Malaysia	40–40	Wales

Tuesday, 18 August	England	59–18	Bermuda

Tuesday, 18 August	Barbados	42–29	Scotland

Tuesday, 18 August	Cook Islands	53–33	Wales

Round 4

Wednesday, 19 August	New Zealand	81–16	Republic of Ireland

Wednesday, 19 August	Bermuda	31–28	Scotland

Wednesday, 19 August ?	Barbados	bt	Wales

Wednesday, 19 August ?	England	bt	Cook Islands

Round 5

Thursday, 20 August	Republic of Ireland	39–31	Wales

Thursday, 20 August	New Zealand	89–8	Bermuda

Thursday, 20 August	Barbados	51–25	Malaysia

Thursday, 20 August	Cook Islands	47–24	Scotland

Round 6

Friday, 21 August	Barbados	61–22	Bermuda

Friday, 21 August	Cook Islands	52–36	Wales

Friday, 21 August	England	59–17	Republic of Ireland

Friday, 21 August	New Zealand	78–9	Malaysia

Round 7

Saturday, 22 August	Cook Islands	56–47	Malaysia

Saturday, 22 August	England	59–25	Scotland

Saturday, 22 August	Barbados	58–25	Republic of Ireland

Saturday, 22 August	New Zealand	94–13	Wales

Round 8

Sunday, 23 August	Republic of Ireland	42–40	Malaysia

Sunday, 23 August	England	68–21	Wales

Monday, 24 August	New Zealand	67–15	Scotland

Monday, 24 August	Cook Islands	50–33	Bermuda

Round 9

Tuesday, 25 August	Bermuda	47–43	Malaysia

Tuesday, 25 August	New Zealand	45–30	England

Tuesday, 25 August	Cook Islands	52–51	Barbados

Tuesday, 25 August	Scotland	43–26	Wales

=== Table ===
Pos	Team	Pld	W	D	L	GF	GA	GD	Pts
1	New Zealand	8	8	0	0	585	146	+439	16
2	England	8	7	0	1	377	180	+197	14
3	Cook Islands	8	6	0	2	337	302	+35	12
4	Barbados	8	5	0	3	327	252	+65	10
5	Bermuda	8	3	1	4	191	364	–173	7
6	Scotland	8	3	0	5	175	267	–92	6
7	Republic of Ireland	8	2	1	5	207	357	–150	5
8	Malaysia	8	0	1	7	248	409	–161	1
9	Wales	8	0	1	7	194	364	–170	1

Qualified for 1st–4th Classification
Qualified for 5th–8th Classification
Qualified for 9th–12th Classification
Qualified for 13th–17th Classification

Notes

- ^1 This table is not 100% accurate as some scores are missing.

== 13th–17th Classification ==
=== Matches ===
Wednesday, 26 August	Republic of Ireland	37–29	Sri Lanka

Wednesday, 26 August	Wales	32–17	Papua New Guinea

Wednesday, 26 August	Papua New Guinea	28–23	Sri Lanka

Wednesday, 26 August	Wales	34–27	Republic of Ireland

Thursday, 27 August	Papua New Guinea	29–26	Malaysia

Thursday, 27 August	Wales	31–20	Sri Lanka

Thursday, 27 August	Wales	36–26	Malaysia

Friday, 28 August	Papua New Guinea	30–29	Republic of Ireland

Friday, 28 August	Republic of Ireland	29–17	Malaysia

Friday, 28 August	Sri Lanka	22–17	Malaysia

=== Final table ===
Pos	Team	Pld	W	D	L	GF	GA	GD	Pts
13	Wales	4	4	0	0	133	90	+43	8
14	Papua New Guinea	4	3	0	1	104	110	–6	6
15	Republic of Ireland	4	2	0	2	122	110	+12	4
16	Sri Lanka	4	1	0	3	94	113	–19	2
17	Malaysia	4	0	0	4	86	116	–30	0

== 9th–12th Classification ==
=== Matches ===
Wednesday, 26 August	Scotland	37–30	Northern Ireland

Wednesday, 26 August	Canada	41–38	Bermuda

Thursday, 27 August	Northern Ireland	41–31	Canada

Thursday, 27 August	Scotland	39–16	Bermuda

Friday, 28 August	Scotland	35–23	Canada

Friday, 28 August	Bermuda	33–32	Northern Ireland

=== Final table ===
Pos	Team	Pld	W	D	L	GF	GA	GD	Pts
9	Scotland	3	3	0	0	111	69	+42	6
10	Northern Ireland	3	1	0	2	103	101	+2	2
11	Bermuda	3	1	0	2	87	112	–25	2
12	Canada	3	1	0	2	95	114	–19	2

== 5th–8th Classification ==
=== Matches ===
Wednesday, 26 August	Jamaica	56–47	Barbados

Wednesday, 26 August	Cook Islands	52–51	Fiji

Thursday, 27 August	Jamaica	72–37	Fiji

Thursday, 27 August	Barbados	42–42	Cook Islands

Friday, 28 August	Barbados	51–36	Fiji

Friday, 28 August	Jamaica	49–48	Cook Islands

=== Final table ===
Pos	Team	Pld	W	D	L	GF	GA	GD	Pts
5	Jamaica	3	3	0	0	177	132	+45	6
6	Barbados	3	1	1	1	140	134	+6	3
7	Cook Islands	3	1	1	1	142	142	0	3
8	Fiji	3	0	0	3	124	175	–51	0

== 1st–4th Classification ==
=== Matches ===
Round 1

Wednesday, 26 August	New Zealand	39–28	Australia

Wednesday, 26 August	Trinidad and Tobago	42–33	England

Round 2

Thursday, 27 August	Trinidad and Tobago	46–46	Australia
			Anne Sargeant 36/54 (67%); Sue Kenny 8/23 (35%) ??? 2

Thursday, 27 August	New Zealand	47–37	England

Round 3

Friday, 28 August	Australia	47–43	England

Friday, 28 August	New Zealand	49–37	Trinidad and Tobago

=== Final table ===
Pos	Team	Pld	W	D	L	GF	GA	GD	Pts
1st place, gold medalist(s)	New Zealand	3	3	0	0	135	102	+33	6
2nd place, silver medalist(s)	Trinidad and Tobago	3	1	1	1	125	128	–3	3
2nd place, silver medalist(s)	Australia	3	1	1	1	121	128	–7	3
4	England	3	0	0	3	113	136	–23	0

== Final placings ==
Place	Nation
1st place, gold medalist(s)	New Zealand
2nd place, silver medalist(s)	Trinidad and Tobago
2nd place, silver medalist(s)	Australia
4	England
5	Jamaica
6=	Barbados
6=	Cook Islands
8	Fiji
9	Scotland
10=	Bermuda
10=	Canada
10=	Northern Ireland
13	Wales
14	Papua New Guinea
15	Republic of Ireland
16	Sri Lanka
17	Malaysia

== Medallists ==
(gold) Gold	(silver) Silver	(silver) Silver
New Zealand; Coach: Lois Muir	Trinidad and Tobago; Coaches: Enid Browne; Jean Pierre	Australia; Coach: Wilma Shakespear
Tracy Eyrl; Rita Fatialofa; Tracey Fear (vc); Margaret Forsyth; Leigh Gibbs (c); Annette Heffernan; Sandra Mallet; Margharet Matenga; Angela Pule; Joan Solia; Waimarama Taumaunu; Julie Townsend	Bridget Adams; Jeanne Bailey; Sherry Ann Blackman; Sharon Castanada; Heather Charleau; Jennifer Frank (c); Hyacinth Hart; Cheryl Herbert; Annette Hutchinson; Muriel Mitchell; Erica Outram; Hazel Taylor	Diane Atkinson; Lisa Beehag; Keeley Devery; Marcia Ella; Chris Harris; Sally Ironmonger; Roselee Jencke; Michelle Jones; Sue Kenny; Janelle Peterson; Anne Sargeant (c); Vicki Wilson
