= Caleb Clarke (rugby union) =

New Zealand rugby union international

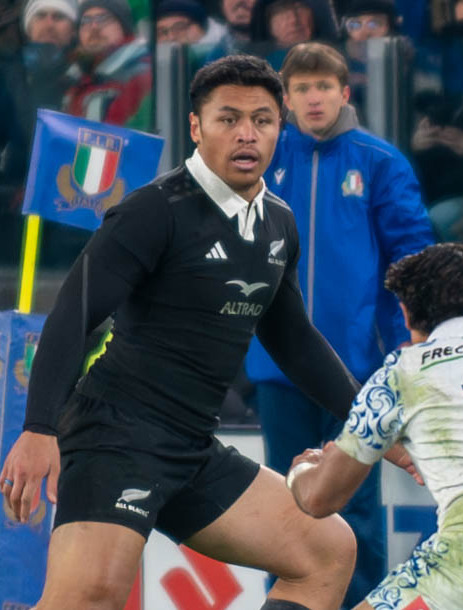
- Clarke with New Zealand in 2024
- Full name: Caleb Daniel Clarke
- Born: 29 March 1999 (age 27) Auckland, New Zealand
- Height: 1.89 m (6 ft 2 in)
- Weight: 112 kg (247 lb; 17 st 9 lb)
- School: Mount Albert Grammar School
- Notable relatives: Eroni Clarke (father); Sheryl Scanlan (aunt); Deine Mariner (cousin)

Rugby union career
- Position: Wing
- Current team: Auckland, Blues
Senior career
Years	Team	Apps	(Points)
2017–	Auckland	25	(55)
2018–	Blues	89	(205)
- Correct as of 25 June 2026
International career
Years	Team	Apps	(Points)
2017–2019	New Zealand U20	11	(40)
2018–2020	New Zealand sevens	25	(50)
2020–	New Zealand	33	(80)
- Correct as of 16 June 2026

Caleb Daniel Clarke (born 29 March 1999) is a New Zealand rugby union player who plays as a wing for the All Blacks, Blues in Super Rugby, and Auckland in the Bunnings NPC.

== Early life ==
Clarke is a Fijian/Samoan New Zealander. His grandfather, Iafeta Clarke, was a member of the Samoa national rugby union team that won the gold medal at the 1963 South Pacific Games. He also played club rugby for Suburbs and was a member of their first Gallaher Shield winning team. His father, Eroni Clarke is a former New Zealand rugby union international. His aunt, Sheryl Clarke, is a former New Zealand netball international. Clarke attended Mount Albert Grammar School and was first selected for the school's First XV aged 14, where he played until 2016.

== International career ==
Clarke was selected for the All Blacks Sevens in 2018, following his first season for Auckland in the Mitre 10 Cup.

Good performances for Auckland also led to Clarke's selection for the New Zealand U20's, for 2017 and 2018.

In 2019, his second season of Super Rugby, Clarke also became a regular starter for the Blues, under new Head Coach, Leon MacDonald.

Due to the COVID-19 pandemic, Clarke, as well as his teammates from the New Zealand national rugby sevens team, were released to play for their provinces and Super Rugby clubs. Clarke was in career-best form following New Zealand's national lockdown, leading to his selection for the All Blacks squad for the 2020 Bledisloe Cup and 2020 Tri Nations Series.

He made his debut for New Zealand in their 16–16 draw with the Wallabies at Wellington's Sky Stadium. After a season-ending injury to George Bridge, Clarke started in four tests that year, on the left wing. Clarke scored his first try for the All Blacks on 14 November, in a historic first-ever loss to Argentina.

== Legal issues ==
In February 2025, Clarke admitted charges of driving dangerously and failing to stop for police. He had been driving a motorcycle in Auckland in December 2024. His lawyer indicated that he would seek a discharge without conviction, with sentencing scheduled for June.

== Career statistics ==
=== List of international tries ===
No.	Date	Venue	Opponent	Score	Result	Competition
1	14 November 2020	Bankwest Stadium, Sydney, Australia	Argentina	15–25	15–25	2020 Tri Nations Series
2	27 August 2022	Rugby League Park, Christchurch, New Zealand	Argentina	13–6	18–25	2022 Rugby Championship
3	3 September 2022	Waikato Stadium, Hamilton, New Zealand	Argentina	15–0	53–3	2022 Rugby Championship
4	29 October 2022	Japan National Stadium, Tokyo, Japan	Japan	26–17	38–31	2022 end-of-year rugby union internationals
5	29 July 2023	Melbourne Cricket Ground, Melbourne, Australia	Australia	24–7	38–7	2023 Rugby Championship
6	5 October 2023	Stadium de Toulouse, Toulouse, France	Namibia	62–3	71–3	2023 Rugby World Cup

as of 5 October 2023
