= Eroni Clarke =

New Zealand rugby union international

Eroni Clarke MNZM
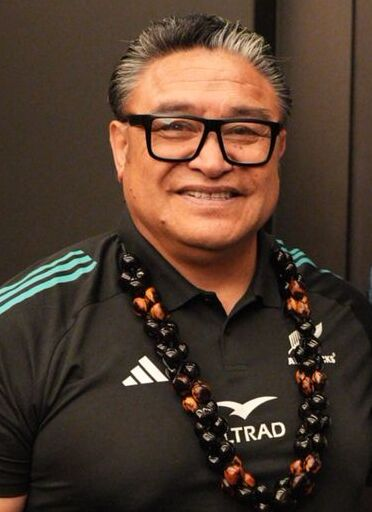
- Clarke in 2026
- Born: 31 January 1969 (age 57) Apia, Samoa
- Height: 186 cm (6 ft 1 in)
- Weight: 90 kg (198 lb; 14 st 2 lb)
- School: Henderson High School
- Notable relative(s): Sheryl Clarke (sister); Caleb Clarke (son)

Rugby union career
- Position(s): Centre, Wing
Senior career
Years	Team	Apps	(Points)
1991–2002	Auckland	150	(349)
1996–2000	Blues	51	(75)
2001	Highlanders	2	(0)
2003–2005	Ricoh Black Rams		
2005	Counties Manukau	10	(15)
International career
Years	Team	Apps	(Points)
1992–1998	New Zealand	24	(50)
1996	New Zealand Barbarians	1	(0)
1997–1998	New Zealand A	4	(0)

Eroni Clarke MNZM (born 31 March 1969) is a New Zealand rugby union international who played for Auckland, the Blues and the Highlanders. Clarke made 155 appearances for Auckland, making him the fifth (equal with Sean Fitzpatrick) most capped player in the union's history. He also scored 73 tries for Auckland, the fourth most in the union's history. Clarke also made 48 appearances for the Auckland Blues at Super 12 level and made twenty-four appearances (ten test matches) for New Zealand, making his international debut in 1992.

In August 2020 Clarke was appointed New Zealand Rugby's first Pasifika Engagement Manager.

In 2020, Eroni was in Match Fit to trim down and prepare for a one-match comeback with fellow ex-All Blacks against recently retired but far more in-shape Barbarians in 8 weeks. He was granted leave on Day 1 after biometric tests, as the day coincided with Caleb Clarke being selected for the All Blacks, and also missed the final Bronco test as it was the week when Caleb made his debut in Wellington. He played in the full-contact match against Pukekohe Presidents as a lock. In 2021/22, he returned for season 2, where he returned to increase his cardio fitness to prepare for the 90's and 2000's Classic Wallabies, whereby the team mostly consisted of players that dominated the Tri Nations against All Blacks and South Africa in that era and won consecutive Bledisloe Cups. He sat out of the first tackle rugby game against East Coast due to impinged nerve in his neck.

== Family ==
Clarke is a Samoan New Zealander. His father, Iafeta Clarke, was a member of the Samoa national rugby union team that won the gold medal at the 1963 South Pacific Games. He also played club rugby for Suburbs and was a member of their first Gallaher Shield winning team. His sister, Sheryl Clarke, is a former New Zealand netball international. His son, Caleb Clarke, is also a New Zealand rugby union international.

== Honours and awards ==
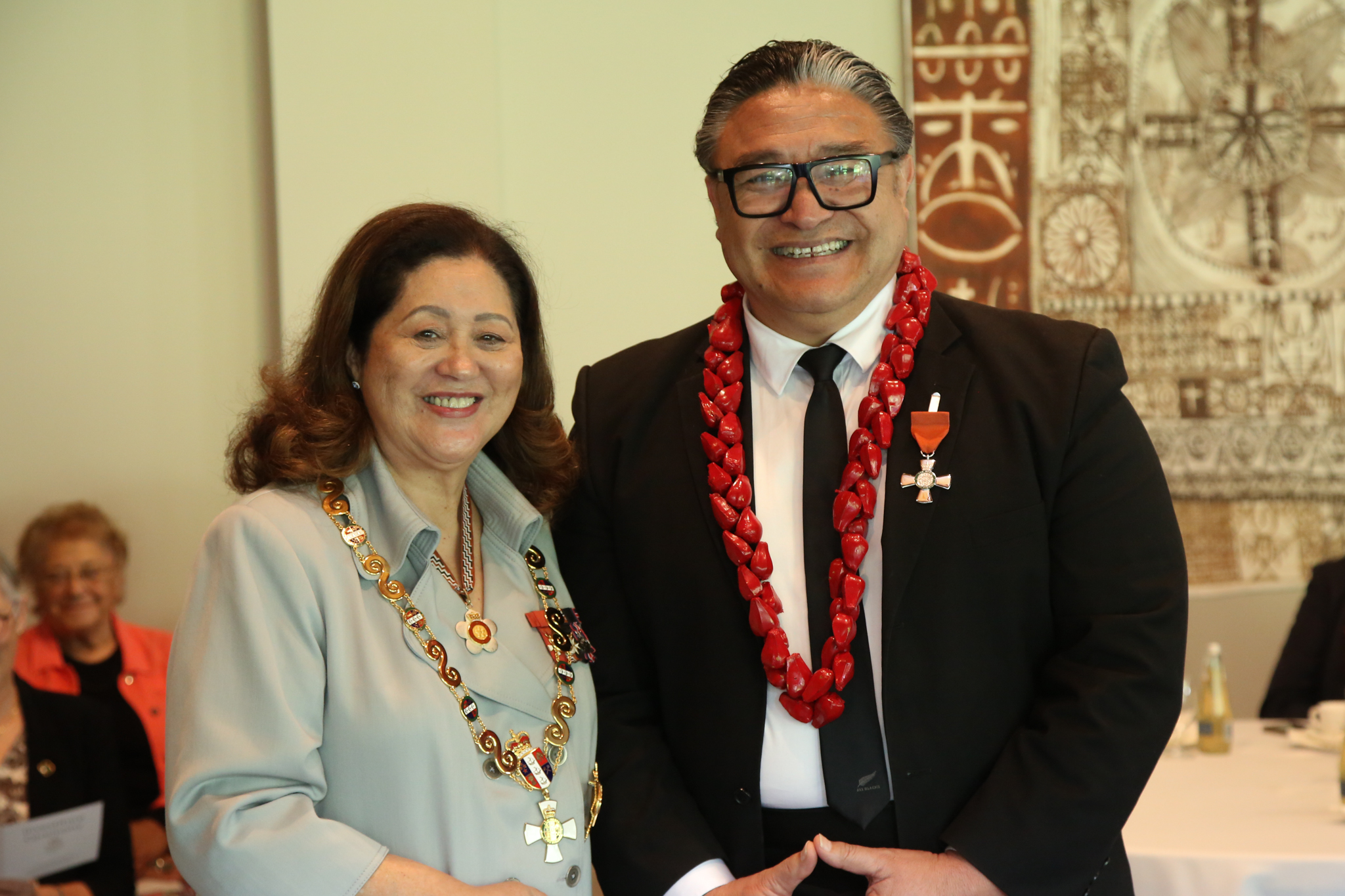
Clarke (right), after his investiture as a Member of the New Zealand Order of Merit by the governor-general, Dame Cindy Kiro, at Government House, Auckland, on 16 April 2026

In the 2026 New Year Honours, Clarke was appointed a Member of the New Zealand Order of Merit, for services to the Pacific community and rugby.
