= House of Travel (travel agency) =

Travel company in New Zealand

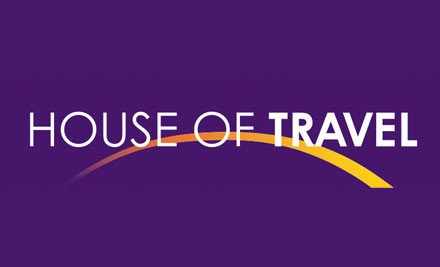
- Industry: Travel
- Founded: 1987; 39 years ago
- Headquarters: Auckland, New Zealand
- Key people: Chris Paulsen, Founder & Executive chairman
- Services: Travel agency
- Number of employees: 826
- Website: houseoftravel.co.nz

House of Travel is the largest privately owned travel agency in New Zealand and the third largest travel organisation in the Asia Pacific region.

The House of Travel Group employs close to 826 staff operating in a number of different brands and businesses, including:

- 61 House of Travel retail travel stores throughout New Zealand
- Orbit World Travel, a specialist business travel service in both New Zealand and Australia
- HOT Events, a conference and incentive management company in New Zealand and Australia.
- Mix and Match, the online branch of House of Travel in New Zealand
- Wanderlust Travel Agents New Zealand
- TravelManagers Australia
- HOOT Holidays Australia

House of Travel was the official agent for travel from New Zealand for the 2014 Commonwealth Games, 2016 Olympic Games in Rio de Janeiro and is the official travel partner of Netball New Zealand and the Silver Ferns.

== History ==
Founded by Chris Paulsen, who remains the Executive Chairman of House of Travel today, the first House of Travel store was established in Timaru in 1987. Each store is run on a joint ownership model – half-owned by a local owner operator, and half-owned by House of Travel Holdings. Local store owners use their regional knowledge and entrepreneurial skill and are supported by House of Travel Holdings (based in Auckland and Christchurch) in areas such as IT, Product, Marketing and HR.

By 1990, House of Travel had opened 33 stores across the North and South Islands. In 1992, House of Travel sees its first $100m year. In 2001, House of Travel identified the growing market segment of corporate travel, resulting in a number of existing locations being rebranded as Orbit Travel to focus almost exclusively on business travel. Orbit is now the largest corporate travel company in New Zealand.

House of Travel launched the first online booking solution in New Zealand in 2004, offering full flight aggregation. House of Travel Online was branded mixandmatch in 2009 and is now the largest online travel agency for flight bookings in New Zealand.

2017 brings the celebration of 30 years for House of Travel and in 2018, founder Chris Paulsen receives a lifetime achievement award from the Travel Agents Association of New Zealand.

2024 saw Chris Paulsen announce his retirement and steps away as CEO from House of Travel, after 37 years. David Coombes is announced as the new CEO, bringing along a wealth of knowledge from his extensive background in the travel industry. Today, there are 61 House of Travel stores across New Zealand, from Kerikeri in the north to Invercargill in the South.

== Awards ==
2006: New Zealand Entrepreneur of the Year, Ernst & Young Awards – Chris Paulsen, Chairman and Founder of House of Travel

2007: Prime Minister's Social Hero Award – for work with Hospice New Zealand

2012, 2013, 2014, 2015, 2016, 2017, 2018, 2019: Randstad Top 20 Most Attractive Employers

2013: Chairman's Circle Honour from the US Travel Association – House of Travel.

2013: Australian Federation of Travel Agents (AFTA) Award for Best Travel Agency Retail, Multi Location.

2013: Australian Federation of Travel Agents (AFTA) Award for Best Travel Agency Corporate, Multi Location.

Travel Agents’ Association of NZ (TAANZ) Award for Best Travel Agency Brand: 2013, 2014, 2015, 2016, 2017, 2019.

2016: New Zealander of the Year Local Hero Award, for support of Hospice Chris Paulsen.

2017, 2018, 2019: Reader's Digest Quality Service Award.

2018: Travel Agents’ Association of New Zealand (TAANZ) National Travel Industry Lifetime Achievement Award, Chris Paulsen.

2020, 2023: Canstar Best Value Travel Insurance

2024: Kantar #1 customer service – Leadership Index Award

2024: #1 Best Places to Work, Large Business Category

2025: Canstar Blue Most Satisfied Customers Award - Travel Agents
