= Sheryl Scanlan =

Samoa and New Zealand netball international

Personal information
- Full name: Sheryl Scanlan (Née: Clarke)
- Born: 8 September 1977 (age 49) West Auckland, New Zealand
- Height: 1.78 m (5 ft 10 in)
- Relatives: Eroni Clarke (brother); Caleb Clarke (nephew)
- School: Auckland Girls' Grammar School

Netball career
- Playing positions: GD, WD
Years	Club team	Apps
1998–2007	Northern Force	
2008	Northern Mystics	
2009–2012	Southern Steel	
Years	National team	Caps
1997	New Zealand	
1999	Samoa	
2000	Team Pasifika	
2000–2009	New Zealand	
Medal record
Representing New Zealand
World Netball Championships
Gold medal – first place	2003 Kingston	Team
Silver medal – second place	2007 Auckland	Team
Commonwealth Games
Silver medal – second place	2002 Manchester	Team

Sheryl Scanlan (born 8 September 1977), originally known as Sheryl Clarke, is a former netball international who has played for Samoa and New Zealand. She captained Samoa at the 1999 World Netball Championships. She was subsequently a member of the New Zealand teams that were gold medallists at the 2003 World Netball Championships and silver medallists at the 2002 Commonwealth Games and 2007 World Netball Championships. During the Coca-Cola Cup/National Bank Cup era, she played for Northern Force. During the ANZ Championship era, she played for Northern Mystics and Southern Steel. In 2022, she was included on a list of the 25 best players to feature in netball leagues in New Zealand since 1998.

== Early life, family and education ==
Sheryl Melevahoi Clarke was born and raised in West Auckland. She is the daughter of Iafeta and Tueipi Clarke. Her family are Samoan. She was the youngest of five children. Her father was a member of the Samoa national rugby union team that won the gold medal at the 1963 South Pacific Games. He also played club rugby for Suburbs and was a member of their first Gallaher Shield winning team. Her brother, Eroni Clarke is a former New Zealand rugby union international. His son and Sheryl's nephew, Caleb Clarke has also played rugby union for New Zealand. Sheryl attended Auckland Girls' Grammar School. She is married to Malcolm Scanlan. Together they have a son. After retiring from netball, Sheryl and her family moved to Brisbane.

== Playing career ==
=== National Provincial Championships ===
In 1995, Clarke was a member of the Auckland team that won a National Provincial Championships title. In the same year she also won titles with Auckland Girls' Grammar School and with Collegiate in the Auckland premier club competition. At NPC level, she later represented Wellington in 1999, Auckland in 2000, Waikato between 2001 and 2002 and North between 2003 and 2005. While playing for Southern Steel, she played for Southland in the NPC.

=== Club career ===
==== Northern Force ====
Between 1998 and 2007, Clarke played for Northern Force in the Coca-Cola Cup/National Bank Cup league. She represented both Samoa and New Zealand while playing for Force. In 2003, she was a member of the Force team that were grand finalists. She missed the 2006 season due to pregnancy. However she returned in 2007.

==== Northern Mystics ====
During the 2008 ANZ Championship season, Scanlan played for Northern Mystics. She was a member of the inaugural Mystics team.

==== Southern Steel ====
Between 2009 and 2012, Scanlan played for Southern Steel in the ANZ Championship. During the 2009 and 2010 season, she suffered from calf injuries, limiting her court time. After rupturing a tendon during the 2012 season, Scanlan subsequently announced she was retiring from elite netball.

=== International career ===
==== Samoa ====
Clarke captained Samoa at the 1999 World Netball Championships.

==== Team Pasifika ====
In June 2000, Clarke was vice captain of the Team Pasifika selection that played New Zealand in a two match series. The team was coached by Te Aroha Keenan and also featured Teresa Tairi, Jenny-May Coffin, Frances Solia and Vilimaina Davu.

==== New Zealand ====
In December 1997, Clarke was included in a touring New Zealand team that played away matches against England and Wales. On 17 December 1997, she made her debut for New Zealand, when they stopped off to play Malaysia on their way home. Clarke missed out on selection for the next two years before being recalled in 2000. In the meantime she played for Samoa. On 25 November 2000, she returned to play for New Zealand in an away match against South Africa. She was subsequently a member of the New Zealand team that were silver medalists at the 2002 Commonwealth Games. She was a prominent member of the New Zealand team that won the 2003 World Netball Championships. In the final she made a crucial intercept that proved a deciding factor in the match. She missed the 2006 Commonwealth Games due to pregnancy. However, in January 2007 she was recalled by Ruth Aitken. and was included in the squad for the 2007 World Netball Championships. Scanlan continued to be included in New Zealand squads until 2009. She finished her New Zealand career win 60 plus senior appearances. In April 2022, she was one of 25 New Zealand internationals included on a list of the best players to feature in netball leagues in New Zealand since 1998.

Tournaments	Place	Team
1999 World Netball Championships	9th	Samoa
2002 Commonwealth Games	2nd place, silver medalist(s)	New Zealand
2003 World Netball Championships	1st place, gold medalist(s)	New Zealand
2007 World Netball Championships	2nd place, silver medalist(s)	New Zealand
2008 Taini Jamison Trophy Series	1st	New Zealand

== Honours ==
New Zealand

- World Netball Championships
  - Winners: 2003
  - Runners Up: 2007
- Commonwealth Games
  - Runners Up: 2002
- Taini Jamison Trophy
  - Winners: 2008

Northern Force

- Coca-Cola Cup/National Bank Cup
  - Runners Up: 2003, 2007
