= Karen Henrikson =

New Zealand netball player and police inspector

Karen Henrikson MNZM
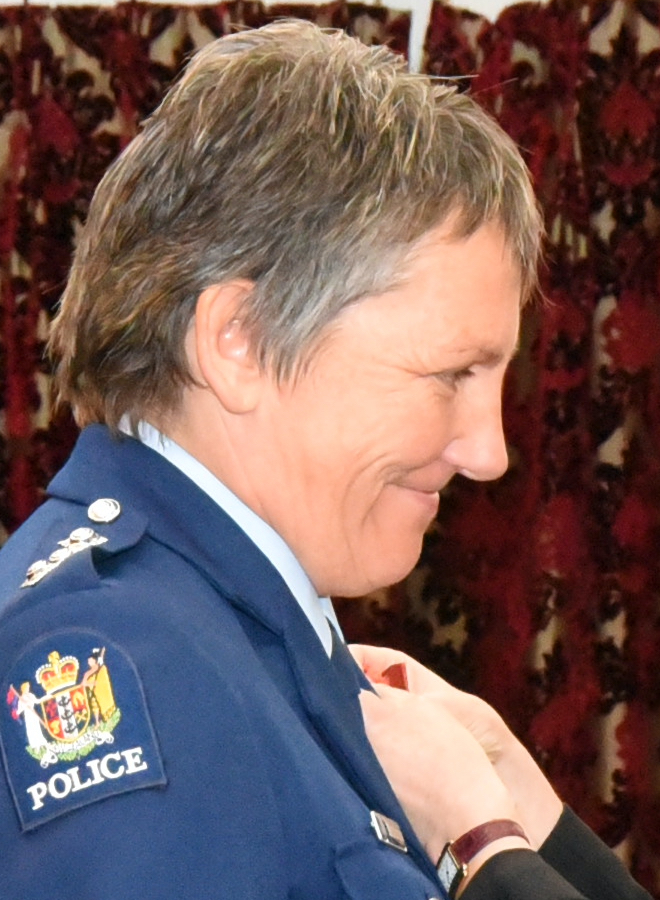
- Henrikson in 2017

Personal information
- Full name: Karen Lee Henrikson
- Born: 20 February 1961 (age 65) Matamata, New Zealand
- Occupation: Police officer
- Height: 1.72 m (5 ft 8 in)
- School: Matamata College

Netball career
- Playing positions: C, WA
Years	National team	Caps
1985–1986	New Zealand	16
Medal record
Representing New Zealand
World Games
Gold medal – first place	1985 London	Netball

Karen Lee Henrikson MNZM (born 20 February 1961) is a former netball player who played on 16 occasions for New Zealand in the 1980s. She served in the New Zealand Police, rising to the rank of inspector, while continuing her involvement with netball as a coach.

== Early life ==
Henrikson was born on 20 February 1961 in Matamata in the Waikato region of New Zealand's North Island. She was brought up on a farm and had two brothers. She went to school at Matamata College.

== Netball playing career ==
Playing for Wellington as a wing attack (WA) or centre (C), Henrikson was first selected for the Silver Ferns in 1985, playing her first game in July of that year, against Northern Ireland. The Silver Ferns were unbeaten in 1985 and she was a member of the team that won the gold medal at that year's World Games, which were held in London. She was reselected for the team in 1986.

== Police career ==
Henrikson joined the New Zealand Police in 1983, at a time when the force was having a big push to attract women. After training, her first posting was to Porirua in the Wellington Region of the North Island. Subsequently she worked in Tokoroa and Hamilton, both in the Waikato region. In 2008, she was appointed to be an inspector, the first woman to achieve that rank in Waikato, where she served as the operations support manager for the Waikato police district. Among other activities, she was responsible for promoting strong relationships with local councils and Māori Focus Forums. She helped to set up the Women's Advisory Network for Waikato and the Safety Comes First group in central Hamilton, which she chaired. This initiative aimed at improving the safety of people in the city's central business district at night. She helped to establish the Hamilton Interagency Youth Action group, which provides support to families at risk of being connected with criminal offending, and she was also involved with child protection activities. Henrikson retired from the police in December 2017.

== Netball coaching ==
For much of her time as a police officer, Henrikson was also able to continue her involvement with netball, including being assistant coach and then coach for the Waikato representative team in the national championships. At Waikato she worked with two other former Silver Ferns, Margaret Forsyth and Tracey Fear.

== Awards and honours ==
In 2012, Henrikson received the award for most outstanding female leader in the Australasian Council of Women and Policing's Excellence in Policing Awards. In the 2017 Queen's Birthday Honours, she was appointed a Member of the New Zealand Order of Merit, for services to the New Zealand Police and the community.
