= Oonah Shannahan =

New Zealand netball player (1921–2022)

Personal information
- Full name: Oonah Fay Shannahan (Née: Murray)
- Born: 3 September 1921 Dunedin, New Zealand
- Died: 28 September 2022 (aged 101) Christchurch, New Zealand
- Height: 1.74 m (5 ft 9 in)

Netball career
- Playing positions: C, WA
Years	National team	Caps
1948	New Zealand	1

Oonah Fay Shannahan (née Murray; 3 September 1921 – 28 September 2022) was a New Zealand netball player. She captained the New Zealand team in their second Test match, in 1948 against Australia.

== Early life ==
Shannahan was born Oonah Fay Murray in Dunedin on 3 September 1921, one of five children of Frederick Joseph Murray and Margaret Murray. Her father worked on the railways, and the family moved to Taihape for five years before settling in Christchurch. She was educated at Sacred Heart Girls' College in Christchurch, where she excelled at sports, winning the senior athletics championship in 1937 and 1938.

== Netball career ==
Murray was captain of the Canterbury provincial netball team, and in 1948 she was selected as captain of the New Zealand national team for the first Test against the touring Australian team at Forbury Park in Dunedin. The match was played under international rules, with seven players per side, which were unfamiliar to the New Zealanders who were used to playing nine-a-side. The Australian team was victorious, winning 27–16. The match was the only occasion on which Murray represented New Zealand, because the New Zealand side for the three-Test series was selected on a regional basis, and she was unavailable for the final game as it conflicted with the wedding of Murray's sister.

== Later life and death ==
Oonah Murray married Francis John Shannahan, a New Zealand secondary schools association football representative that toured Australia in 1938. The couple had two children, and he died in 2009.

After her playing career, Shannahan continued her involvement in netball as an administrator, and she received a Netball New Zealand service award. She lived with her daughter at McCormacks Bay, and celebrated her 100th birthday on 3 September 2021. She died in Christchurch on 28 September 2022, at the age of 101. At the time of her death, she was the oldest living New Zealand netball international.
