= Murray Muir =

New Zealand cricketer

Personal information
- Full name: Murray Fergus Muir
- Born: 16 February 1928; Dunedin, Otago, New Zealand
- Died: 5 October 2004 (aged 76); Dunedin, Otago, New Zealand
- Bowling: Right-arm offbreak
- Relatives: Lois Muir (wife)

Domestic team information
- Years: Team
- 1949/40: Otago

Career statistics
Competition	First-class
Matches	1
Runs scored	0
Batting average	0.00
100s/50s	0/0
Top score	0
Balls bowled	30
Wickets	0
Bowling average	–
5 wickets in innings	–
10 wickets in match	–
Best bowling	–
Catches/stumpings	1/–
- Source: ESPNcricinfo, 22 October 2020

Murray Fergus Muir (16 February 1928 – 5 October 2004) was a New Zealand cricketer. He played one first-class match for Otago during the 1949–50 season.

Muir was born at Dunedin in 1928. An off break bowler who played club cricket for the Grange club in Dunedin, he played for an Otago side against Southland in December 1949 before playing in his only first-class fixture later in the season. Against Canterbury at Carisbrook he did not take a wicket in five overs and recorded a duck in the only innings in which he batted. A contemporary newspaper article in the Otago Daily Times, described him as a slow-medium bowler who "swings the ball very late and bowls an excellent off-break".

Muir married netball player and coach Lois Osborne in 1955; the couple went on to have three children. He died at Anderson's Bay in Dunedin in 2004 at the age of 76.
