= Ron Withell =

New Zealand amateur boxer (1916–1998)

Personal information
- Full name: Ronald William Withell
- Born: 9 March 1916; Mosgiel, New Zealand
- Died: 14 May 1998 (aged 82)
- Occupation: Prison officer
- Spouse(s): Ethel Joyce Neame (m. 1944; died 1956) Authie May Anderson (m. 1971)

Sport
- Country: New Zealand
- Sport: Amateur boxing

Achievements and titles
- National finals: Heavyweight champion (1937); Light heavyweight champion (1939)

Ronald William Withell (9 March 1916 – 14 May 1998) was a New Zealand amateur boxer, who represented his country at the 1938 British Empire Games, and won two national amateur titles.

== Early life ==
Born on 9 March 1916, Withell was the eldest son of William Withell and Sarah Jane Withell (née Wilkinson), who farmed at Winchmore, near Ashburton.

Withell took up amateur boxing in 1937, and won the New Zealand heavyweight title that year in only his eighth competitive bout, having beaten Morrie McHugh in the semi-final. He was then selected to represent New Zealand in the heavyweight division at the 1938 British Empire Games, but his lack of experience told, and he was defeated in his opening bout when he was knocked out in the first round by South African Claude Sterley, who went on to win the silver medal.

== Career ==
Withell won the national amateur light-heavyweight title in 1939, before enlisting to serve in the New Zealand forces during World War II. Withell had a record of 24 amateur bouts in New Zealand, for 21 wins, on draw and two losses. He served with the 2nd New Zealand Expeditionary Force (2NZEF) in Egypt, where he won the Army light-heavyweight boxing Middle East forces title, and was a member of the 2NZEF brass band at Maadi Camp, playing the euphonium.

Withell returned to New Zealand in early 1944, and, after the war, took up a rehabilitation farm at Leeston, where he was active with the local brass band, as a boxing trainer and in the Returned Services' Association (RSA). After selling the farm in 1955, Withell rejoined the army, based at Burnham Camp, where he was a storeman and clerk. In 1956, he was promoted from private to lance corporal, and he retired from the army in 1960. He then lived near Weedons, training horses for harness racing, and working as a prison officer for 14 years at Paparua Prison. He served on the executive of the Paparua RSA, including as its president between 1981 and 1982, and was later the branch patron.

== Family life ==
He was twice married: firstly to Ethel Joyce Neame in 1944—with whom he had two children—until her death from accidental drowning in 1956; and later, from 1971, to Authie May Anderson.

== Death ==
Withell died on 14 May 1998, and was buried at Ellesmere Cemetery.
