= 2022 Taini Jamison Trophy Series =

International netball series

Tournament details
- Host country: New Zealand
- City: Auckland
- Venue(s): Eventfinda Stadium; Pulman Arena
- Dates: 21–22 September 2022
- Teams: 2
- TV partner(s): Sky Sport (New Zealand); Prime

Final positions
- Champions: New Zealand (10th title)
- Runners-up: Jamaica

Tournament statistics
- Matches played: 2
- Top scorer(s): Grace Nweke 84/89 (94%)

The 2022 Taini Jamison Trophy Series, also known as the 2022 Cadbury Netball Series, was the 13th Taini Jamison Trophy series. It featured New Zealand playing Jamaica in two netball test matches, played in September 2022. Both tests were played in Auckland. New Zealand won the opening test 70–45. They then defeated Jamaica 75–35 in the second test to win the series 2–0. The New Zealand team were coached by Noeline Taurua and captained by Ameliaranne Ekenasio. Jamaica were coached by Connie Francis and captained by Shimona Nelson. The series was originally due to start earlier and feature matches played at Hamilton's Globox Arena. However complications with passports and visas saw the Jamaica team's arrival in New Zealand delayed. This also resulted in Jamaica playing a severely under strength team. Following an investigation, World Netball would later fine Netball Jamaica GBP £5,000 (NZD $9,800) for failing to fulfil the original fixtures planned for the series.

== Squads ==
=== New Zealand ===
New Zealand roster
Players
Coaches

Name	Pos	DOB	Height	Club	Nat	Caps
Ameliaranne Ekenasio (c)	GA, GS	11 January 1991 (aged 31)	1.86 m (6 ft 1 in)	Waikato Bay of Plenty Magic
Sulu Fitzpatrick (vc)	GK, GD, WD	20 August 1992 (aged 30)	1.88 m (6 ft 2 in)	Northern Mystics
Maddy Gordon	C, WA, WD	16 January 2000 (aged 22)	1.74 m (5 ft 9 in)	Central Pulse
Kate Heffernan (injured)	WD, C, WA	7 October 1999 (aged 22)	1.81 m (5 ft 11 in)	Southern Steel
Kayla Johnson	GD, WD, C	13 February 1992 (aged 30)	1.83 m (6 ft 0 in)	Northern Stars
Kelly Jury	GK, GD	22 October 1996 (aged 25)	1.92 m (6 ft 4 in)	Central Pulse
Phoenix Karaka	GK, GD	6 November 1993 (aged 28)	1.86 m (6 ft 1 in)	Northern Mystics
Grace Nweke	GS	7 February 2002 (aged 20)	1.93 m (6 ft 4 in)	Northern Mystics
Mila Reuelu-Buchanan	WA, C	11 May 1998 (aged 24)	1.72 m (5 ft 8 in)	Northern Stars
Te Paea Selby-Rickit	GS, GA	14 January 1992 (aged 30)	1.93 m (6 ft 4 in)	Mainland Tactix
Whitney Souness	C, WA	12 November 1995 (aged 26)	1.74 m (5 ft 9 in)	Central Pulse
Elle Temu	GK, GD	3 August 1999 (aged 23)	1.88 m (6 ft 2 in)	Northern Stars
Maia Wilson	GS, GA	21 September 1997 (aged 25)	1.87 m (6 ft 2 in)	Northern Stars

Head coach

- Noeline Taurua

Notes

- (c) – Captain
- (cc) – Co-captain
- (vc) – Vice-captain
- – Injury / maternity leave
- (TRP) – Temporary Replacement Player

Debuts

- Elle Temu made her senior debut for New Zealand in the first test.

=== Jamaica ===
When Jamaica announced their original squad for the series it was already under strength, missing several of their leading players from their silver medal winning 2022 Commonwealth Games team. Notable absentees included Shanice Beckford, Kadie-Ann Dehaney, Jhaniele Fowler, Shamera Sterling and Jodi-Ann Ward. However complications with passports and visas resulted in Jamaica naming a severely under strength team. Five players named in the original squad were unable to travel. They eventually had to include their coach, Connie Francis, new mother Romelda Aiken-George and the retired Carla Borrego in their squad to make up the mandatory ten players required for a recognised international match.

Jamaica roster
Players
Coaches

Name	Pos	DOB	Height	Club	Nat	Caps
Romelda Aiken-George (TRP)	GS, GA	19 November 1988 (aged 33)	1.96 m (6 ft 5 in)	Queensland Firebirds
Gezelle Alison	GA, WD		–
Carla Borrego (TRP)	GA, GS	11 November 1983 (aged 38)	1.93 m (6 ft 4 in)
Mischa Creary	GK, GA		–
Connie Francis (TRP)		(aged 54)	–
Abbeygail Linton	WD, GK		–
Shimona Nelson (c)	GS	1 December 1998 (aged 23)	1.95 m (6 ft 5 in)	Collingwood Magpies
Abigale Sutherland	C		–
Adean Thomas	C, WA, WD	31 July 1994 (aged 28)	1.72 m (5 ft 8 in)
Latanya Wilson (vc)	GD, WD, GK	10 November 2000 (aged 21)	1.88 m (6 ft 2 in)	Adelaide Thunderbirds

Head coach

- Connie Francis

Assistant coach

- Annette Daley

Notes

- (c) – Captain
- (cc) – Co-captain
- (vc) – Vice-captain
- – Injury / maternity leave
- (TRP) – Temporary Replacement Player

== Match officials ==
Umpires

Umpire	Association
Tania Fink	New Zealand
Cory Nicholls	New Zealand
Gareth Fowler	New Zealand

Umpire Appointments Panel

Umpire	Association
David Pala'amo	New Zealand
Kirsten Lloyd	New Zealand

== Matches ==
=== Original series ===
The series was originally scheduled to feature three test matches, with the first two matches to be played at Hamilton's Globox Arena on 17 and 18 September, with the third match at Auckland's Eventfinda Stadium on 21 September. However passport and visa issues affecting the Jamaica team caused the series to be reduced to two matches, with both matches held in Auckland.

==== First Test ====
17 September 2022	New Zealand	v	Jamaica	Globox Arena

==== Second Test ====
18 September 2022	New Zealand	v	Jamaica	Globox Arena

=== Revised series ===
==== First Test ====
21 September 2022; 19:30 NZT	New Zealand	70–45	Jamaica	Eventfinda Stadium
21 September 2022; 19:30 NZT	Scoring by quarter: 21–10, 36–20, 54–33, 70–45			Eventfinda Stadium
21 September 2022; 19:30 NZT	Grace Nweke 59/63 (94%); Ameliaranne Ekenasio 7/7 (100%); Te Paea Selby-Rickit 4/7 (57%)		Shimona Nelson 36/41 (88%); Gezelle Allison 9/14 (64%)	Eventfinda Stadium

==== Second Test ====
22 September 2022; 19:00 NZT	New Zealand	75–35	Jamaica	Pulman Arena
22 September 2022; 19:00 NZT	Scoring by quarter: 20–11, 36–22, 56–28, 75–35			Pulman Arena
22 September 2022; 19:00 NZT	Maia Wilson 30/31 (97%); Grace Nweke 25/26 (96%); Ameliaranne Ekenasio 16/17 (94%); Te Paea Selby-Rickit 4/4 (100%)		Shimona Nelson 26/27 (96%); Gezelle Allison 7/12 (58%); Mischa Creary 2/5 (40%)	Pulman Arena
