= Joan Hodson =

New Zealand netball player, umpire and coach

Joan Hodson (née Solia) is a former international netball player for New Zealand who was part of New Zealand's winning team at the 1987 World Netball Tournament. She represented her country on 35 occasions and went on to qualify as an international netball umpire.

== Early life ==
Joan Hodson attended McAuley High School, Auckland between 1975 and 1979. She attended the Carrington Technical Institute from 1980 to 1982, studying mechanical engineering. Changing career direction, she studied at the Auckland Teachers Training College between 1983 and 1986, receiving a certificate in primary school teaching.

== Netball playing career ==
Hodson first played for the Auckland netball team in 1982 and would stay with that team for 12 seasons. She was called up for the Silver Ferns, the New Zealand national netball team, in 1986 and would go on to play for the team on 35 occasions until 1993. Hodson was a member of the victorious team in the 1987 World Netball Tournament and of the team that lost 53–52 to Australia in the final of the 1991 Netball World Championships. Also in 1991, she competed for New Zealand in the Touch Football World Cup, which was held in Auckland. In 1993 she competed for the Silver Ferns in the 1993 World Games, winning a silver medal.

== Umpiring, teaching and coaching ==
Hodson's experience of what she considered to be poor umpiring in the 1991 world cup final convinced her to become an umpire. She also felt that women's netball should be refereed by women, not by men, which was common at that time. She obtained international umpiring qualifications and went on to umpire games in the world championships and the Commonwealth Games.

Hodson coached the Auckland Diamonds team in 2002 and 2003. She was head of physical education at Green Bay High School near Auckland. Between 2008 and 2014 she was a Dean at St Dominic's Catholic College, located in Henderson the Western suburbs of Auckland. She is presently a Dean and teacher at the Sacred Heart Girls' College, New Plymouth, in the Taranaki region of the North Island of New Zealand. She coaches netball at the school and at the Taranaki netball club, where she has also served as President. She also does radio and television commentaries on netball matches.
