= Tracey Fear =

New Zealand netball player

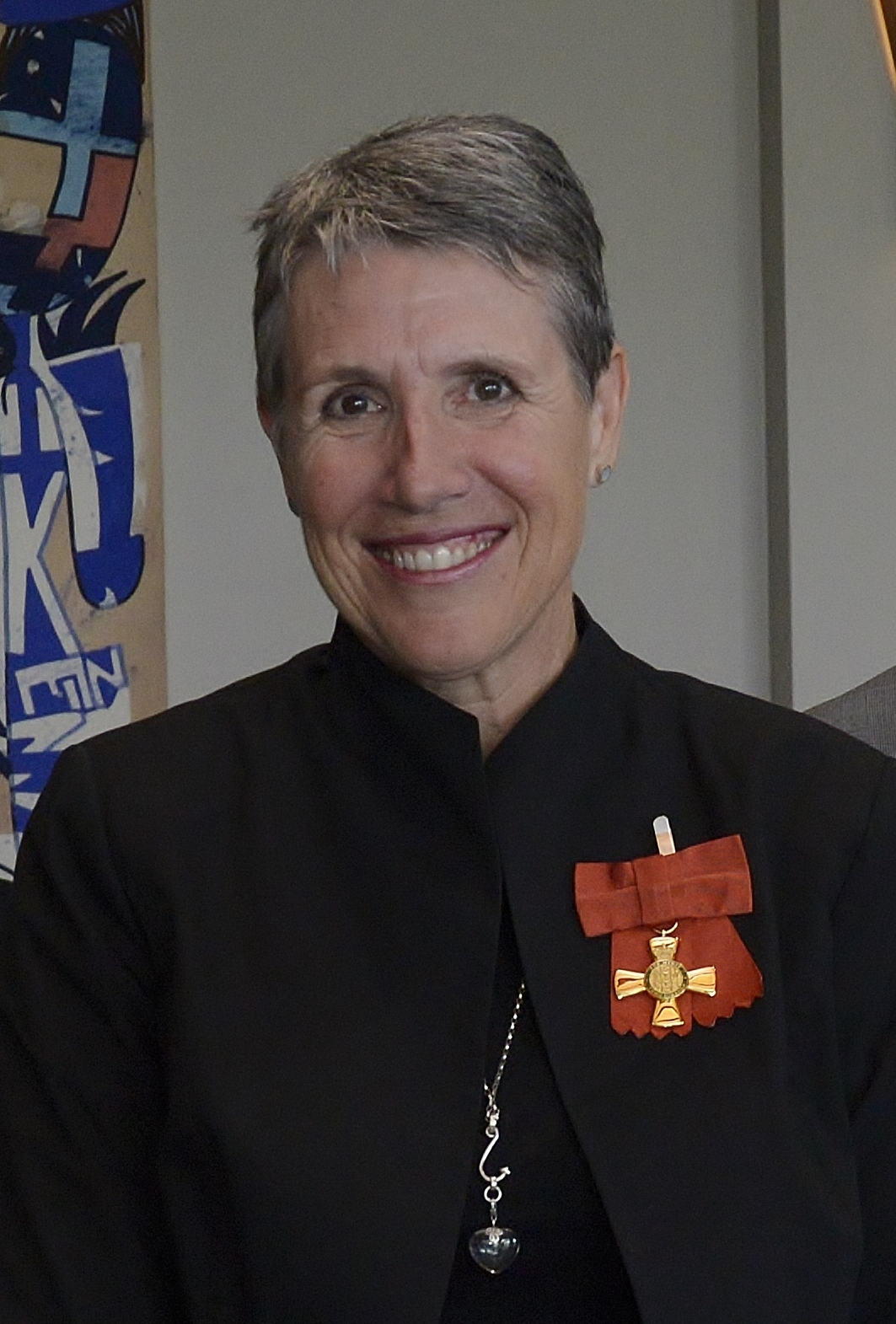
- Fear after receiving her ONZM in October 2018

Personal information
- Full name: Née: Robbie
- Born: 19 August 1959 (age 67) Canberra, ACT, Australia
- Occupation: High Performance Consultant
- Height: 1.83 m (6 ft 0 in)
- Spouse: Terry Fear
- Relatives: daughter Robbie, son Joel
- School: Narrabundah College, ACT

Netball career
- Playing positions: GK, GD
Years	National team	Caps
1982–88	New Zealand	63

Tracey Fear ONZM (born 1959) is an Australian-born former netball player who played 63 times for New Zealand. In 1999 she was chosen as a member of New Zealand's "Team of the Century". She later worked for Netball New Zealand and was made an Officer of the New Zealand Order of Merit in 2018.

== Early life ==
Tracey Fear was born in Canberra, Australia on 19 August 1959. Her parents were talented athletes, mother played netball, while her father played Australian rules football, cricket and competed in veteran athletics into his 70’s. She moved to New Zealand in 1974 when her father was posted to the Australian High Commission in New Zealand's capital, Wellington where she met her future husband while at Hutt Valley High School.In 1978, Tracey married Terry in Canberra before moving back to NZ and following 3 years of representing ACT in netball, she began her netball career in NZ.

== Netball career ==
Fear played her first game for the Silver Ferns, the New Zealand national netball team, against Australia on 10 July 1982. She retired in 1988, being captain of the team in that year. She was a member of the national team in the 1983 World Netball Tournament when New Zealand finished second to Australia, and in the gold medal-winning team in the 1987 World Netball Tournament. Fear also won a gold medal at the 1985 World Games and inaugural Australia games. She usually played in the goal keeper position and formed a dominant defensive pairing for the Silver Ferns with Waimarama Taumaunu.

== Coaching career ==
Fear gained post-graduate diplomas in sports studies and business management from the University of Otago and the University of Waikato. She co-coached the New Zealand U21 Team in 1995-96, Coached the New Zealand A team in 1997-98, Waikato 1989-94, before finishing coaching in 2000 with Waikato Bay of Plenty Magic. In 1995 she started work with Netball New Zealand, first as a netball development officer and then, from 2000, as Netball Director and High-Performance Director. Returning to Australia in 2013, she first worked as the GM High Performance for Netball New South Walesbefore moving to Maroochydore and working for Netball Queensland as their Performance Pathways Manager. Tracey relocated back to NZ in 2020 and now contracts to HPSNZ as a High Performance Consultant .

== Awards ==
Fear was made an Officer the New Zealand Order of Merit (ONZM) in 2018. In 1999 she was named in Netball New Zealand's Team of the Century and in May 2025 named in Netball ACT's Team of the last 50 Years. In 2012 she received the Netball New Zealand Service Award and in 2026 was made a Life Member of Netball New Zealand.
