= Ethel Withell =

New Zealand netball player

Personal information
- Full name: Ethel Joyce Withell (Née: Neame)
- Born: 4 March 1919
- Died: 8 January 1956 (aged 36) Christchurch, New Zealand
- Height: 1.75 m (5 ft 9 in)
- Spouse: Ron Withell (m. 1944)

Netball career
- Playing position: C
Years	National team	Caps
1938	New Zealand	1

Ethel Joyce Withell (née Neame; 4 March 1919 – 8 January 1956) was a New Zealand netball player. She was a member of the New Zealand team in their first Test match, in 1938 against Australia.

== Early life ==
Withell was born Ethel Joyce Neame on 4 March 1919. She was educated at Southland Technical College in Invercargill, where she captained the school netball team. in 1934, she was described as a "really clever centre".

== Netball career ==
=== Domestic ===
Neame played representative netball for Southland from 1935, and was named in the South Island team.

=== International ===
In 1936, Neame was first selected to tour Australia with a New Zealand national team the following season, but the tour did not proceed. In 1938, she was once again selected for the New Zealand netball team, when a national side travelled to Australia and competed in the Australian interstate tournament in Melbourne. At times, the New Zealand team struggled as the matches were played on grass courts under Australian rules, which differed from those used in New Zealand at the time, but they defeated Queensland 13–9, before losing to Victoria 16–48. However, in an exhibition match played under New Zealand rules, the New Zealand team beat Victoria 19–5. In New Zealand's remaining matches of the tournament, they were defeated by South Australia 14–47 and Tasmania 17–32, before overcoming New South Wales 21–18. Neame played in all the matches except the defeat by Tasmania.

Neame played in the single Test match, the first played between New Zealand and Australia, in Melbourne on 20 August 1938. New Zealand were defeated 11–40. The match was played under Australian rules.

== Later life ==
On 29 March 1944, Neame married Ron Withell, who had represented New Zealand in boxing at the 1938 British Empire Games, and the couple went on to have two children. After World War II, they lived on a farm at Leeston, until selling it in 1955. Ethel Withell accidentally drowned at Christchurch on 8 January 1956. She was buried at the Ruru Lawn Cemetery in the Christchurch suburb of Bromley.
