= Jean Lomax =

New Zealand netball player

Personal information
- Full name: Jean Betty Lomax (Née: Willson)
- Born: 25 December 1910 Wellington, New Zealand
- Died: 7 August 1990 (aged 79)
- Height: 1.63 m (5 ft 4 in)

Netball career
- Playing positions: GS, GA, WA
Years	National team	Caps
1938	New Zealand	1

Jean Betty Lomax (née Willson; 25 December 1910 – 7 August 1990) was a New Zealand netball player. She played for the New Zealand team in their first Test match, in 1938 against Australia.

== Early life ==
Born Jean Betty Willson in Wellington on 25 December 1910, Lomax was the daughter of Emily Beatrice Willson (née Boyes) and Percy William Copeman Willson. She was educated at Wellington Technical College where she excelled at athletics, winning the junior girls' championship in 1925, and the senior girls' title in 1926.

== Athletics ==
Willson represented Wellington at athletics. In January 1929, she finished second by eight yards to 1928 Olympian and national 100 yards champion Norma Wilson in a 100 yards race in Gisborne, where Wilson equalled the national record for the distance. At the 1930 national athletics championships, Willson was a finalist in the women's 100 yards, and was a member of the Wellington 4 × 110 yards relay team, alongside Norman Wilson, Thelma Kench and C. Millar, that won the national title.

A member of the Wellington Amateur Athletic Club, Willson served as a member of the club committee.

== Netball ==
=== Domestic ===
Willson was a member of the Wellington 'B' team in 1930 and 1931, and played for the top Wellington team as a defender in 1932. In 1936, she switched from playing as a defender to the attacking third, and once again was selected to represent her province in 1936 and 1937. She also represented the North Island in 1936 and 1937. In 1938, her play was described as being "speedy and active" and she was said to be "shooting accurately".

=== International ===
In 1936, Willson was first selected to tour Australia with a New Zealand national team the following season, but the tour did not proceed. In 1938, Willson was selected when a national side travelled to Australia and competed in the Australian interstate tournament in Melbourne. At times, the New Zealand team struggled as the matches were played on grass courts under Australian rules, which differed from those used in New Zealand at the time, but they defeated Queensland 13–9, before losing to Victoria 16–48 However, in an exhibition match played under New Zealand rules, the New Zealand team beat Victoria 19–5. In New Zealand's remaining matches of the tournament, they were defeated by South Australia 14–47 and Tasmania 17–32, before overcoming New South Wales 21–18. Willson played in all of the matches except against South Australia.

Willson played in the single Test match, the first played between New Zealand and Australia, in Melbourne on 20 August 1938. New Zealand were defeated 11–40 in the match, which was played under Australian rules.

== Later life and death ==
Willson married Aubrey Perry Lomax. She died on 7 August 1990, and her ashes were buried in Tuamarina Cemetery.
