= Leigh Gibbs =

New Zealand netball player

Leigh Gibbs CNZM
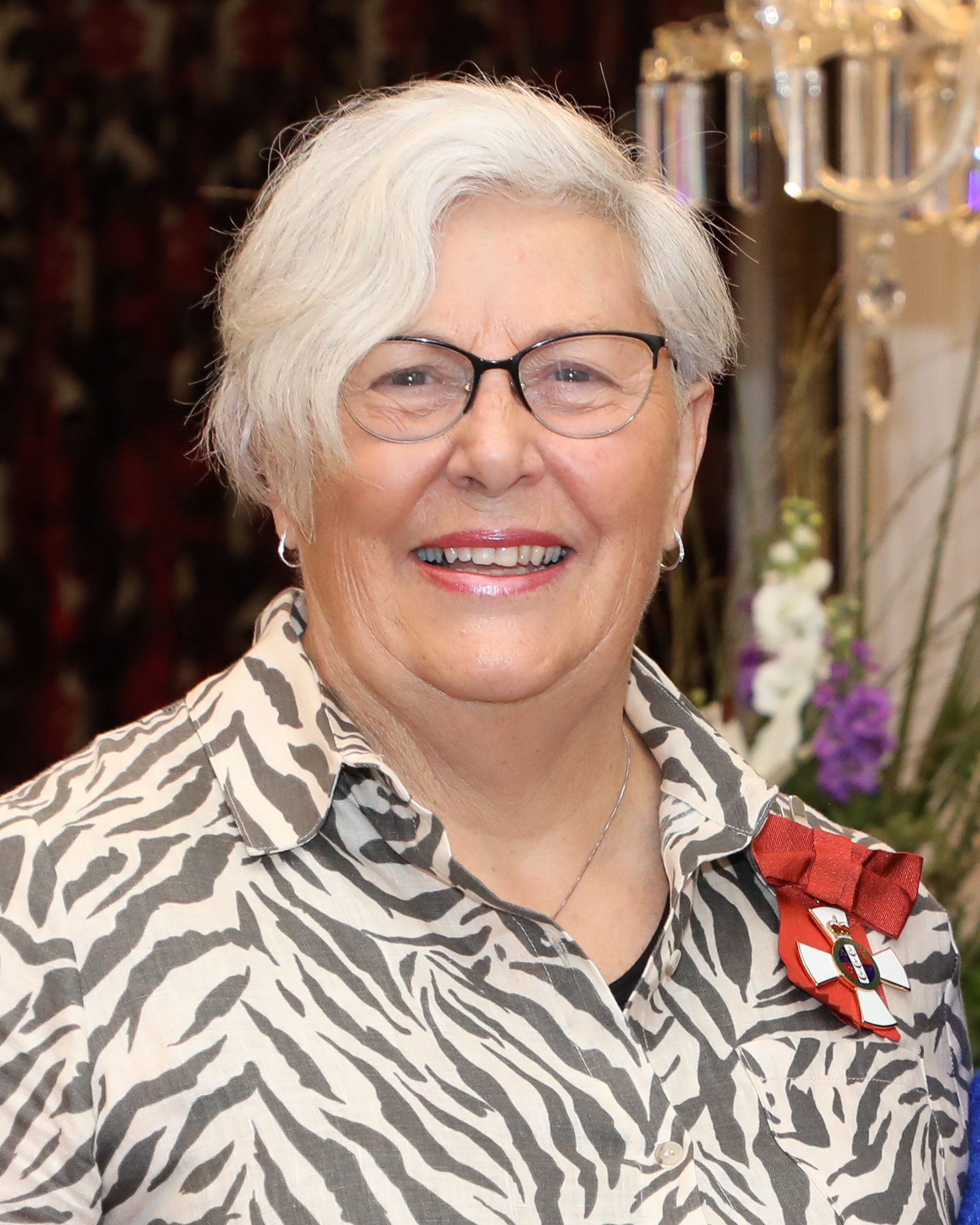
- Gibbs in 2023

Personal information
- Full name: Leigh Helen Gibbs (Née: Mills)
- Born: 17 July 1956 (age 70) Gisborne, New Zealand
- Height: 1.76 m (5 ft 9 in)

Netball career
- Playing position: WD
Years	Club team	Apps
1974–1976	Otago	
1977–1987	Canterbury	
Years	National team	Caps
1978–1987	New Zealand	61

Leigh Helen Gibbs CNZM (née Mills, born 1956) is a New Zealand retired netball player who played for the national team on 61 occasions and was captain for the 1987 World Netball Tournament when New Zealand won the gold medal. She was made an Officer of the New Zealand Order of Merit (ONZM) in 2001.

== Early life ==
Leigh Helen Gibbs (née Mills) was born in Gisborne, New Zealand on 17 July 1956. She was educated at Lytton High School in Gisborne. She obtained a diploma in physical education at the University of Otago, following this with a one-year course to obtain an education diploma at the Christchurch College of Education.

== Netball career ==
Gibbs represented Otago in netball from 1974 to 1976 and Canterbury from 1977 to 1986. She was called up to play for the New Zealand national netball team, later called the Silver Ferns, in 1978 and played for them until 1987. She was captain in 1986 and 1987, being in that role when New Zealand dominated the 1987 World Netball Tournament. She also played in the 1979 and 1983 World Netball Tournaments.

== Coaching ==
Gibbs was a New Zealand netball umpire from 1987 to 1993. She started coaching the Canterbury Flames in 1988 and coached the New Zealand Under-21 team in 1991 and 1992 when the team won the Under-21 World Championship. She became the Silver Ferns' sixth coach, when she was appointed to lead the team in 1994. She coached the team in the 1995 World Netball Championships, when New Zealand finished in a disappointing third place. She left the role in mid-1997. Having spent a season coaching in Wales, Gibbs was the Talent Development Coordinator for Netball New Zealand from 2002 and was an assistant coach to Ruth Aitken for the Silver Ferns when the team won a gold medal at the 2003 World Netball Championships and at the 2006 Commonwealth Games. From 2012 to 2014 she coached the Mainland Tactix. In 2021 she joined the Nelson Netball Centre in New Zealand as the manager, after having spent the previous five years working in Australia at the Queensland State Netball Centre.

== Honours and awards ==
Gibbs was appointed an Officer of the New Zealand Order of Merit, for services to netball, in the 2001 New Year Honours. She received a place on the "Wall of Fame" of the School of Physical Education at the University of Otago in 2006. She was made the 32nd honorary life member of Netball New Zealand in 2017. In the 2023 New Year Honours, Gibbs was promoted to Companion of the New Zealand Order of Merit, for services to netball.

On 18 October 2026, Gibbs was inducted into the Netball New Zealand Hall of Fame.

== Personal life ==
She married Steve Gibbs and they have two sons.
