= Margharet Matenga =

Cook Islands netball player, coach and administrator

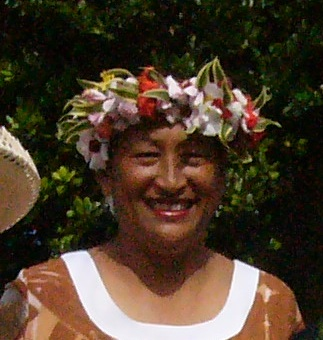
Matenga in 2007

Margharet Norma Matenga MBE (née Kamana; born 1955 or 1956) is a former Cook Islands netball player, coach and administrator. She played for both the New Zealand national netball team and Cook Islands national netball team and was the first Pacific Islander to play for the Silver Ferns. She is the daughter of Cook Islands MP Teanua Kamana.

Matenga was born in Rarotonga. After playing senior tennis as a teenager, she moved to Auckland, New Zealand in 1973 to pursue a professional tennis career. In 1974 she moved to Wellington, where she joined a local Pacific Islands Church netball team. In 1975 she trialed for the Silver Ferns and was selected for the 1975 World Netball Tournament as a reserve. In 1978 she was selected for the team, becoming the first Pacific Islander to play for the Silver Ferns. She subsequently competed in three World Netball Tournaments, as well as the Netball at the 1985 World Games. During the 1980s, Matenga formed a notable shooting partnership with fellow Silver Fern Margaret Forsyth, known together as the "two Margs".

In 1989 Matenga returned to the Cook Islands, where she played for and later coached the Cook Islands national netball team, and later served as president of the Cook Islands Netball Association. She stood unsuccessfully as an independent for Titikaveka in the 2018 Cook Islands general election. She was appointed a Member of the Order of the British Empire, for services to netball, in the 1990 New Years honours.

She ran as a candidate for the Cook Islands United Party at the 2022 election, losing the seat of Titikaveka by just three votes.
