= Sandra Edge =

New Zealand netball player

Sandra Edge MBE
Personal information
- Full name: Sandra Helen Edge
- Born: 26 August 1962 (age 64) Te Puia Springs, New Zealand
- Height: 1.71 m (5 ft 7 1/2 in)
- Children: Christian Gray

Netball career
- Playing positions: C, WA, WD
Years	National team	Caps
1985–94	New Zealand	94
Coaching career
- Years: Team
- 2017–present: Central Pulse
Medal record
Representing New Zealand
Netball World Cup
Gold medal – first place	1987 Glasgow	Netball
Silver medal – second place	1991 Sydney	Netball
Bronze medal – third place	1995 Birmingham	Netball
- Updated on 24 May 2018

Sandra Edge MBE (born 26 August 1962 in Te Puia Springs) is a New Zealand netball coach and former international netball player.

Edge was brought up in Tokomaru Bay where she attended at Primary level Tokomaru School. For her Secondary schooling she was a boarder at Iona College in Havelock North, with her final year at Lytton High School in Gisborne. On leaving school, Sandra began training in 1980 at the Wellington School for Dental Nurses, Willis Street, graduating in 1982. During that time Sandra became more serious about netball, and began truly showing her talent.She captained the New Zealand under 21 team in 1982, aged 17. Sandra debuted for the Silver Ferns New Zealand national netball team in Melbourne in 1985, against Australia For the next ten years she played in a record 94 internationals and three world championships; the team won the world title in 1987. She became New Zealand team captain in 1994, and retired in 1995. The team defeated England and South Africa, and came third in the 1995 world championship. As a player she was noted as the best Centre in the world.

In 1990, Edge was awarded the New Zealand 1990 Commemoration Medal. In the 1995 Queen's Birthday Honours, she was appointed a Member of the Order of the British Empire, for services to netball. She was inducted into the New Zealand Sports Hall of Fame in 2002.

Edge later became a netball coach, and in 2016 was appointed assistant coach for the Central Pulse in the new ANZ Premiership competition.

In 2024, Edge was an inaugural inductee to the Netball New Zealand Hall of Fame.
