= Lois Muir =

New Zealand netball and basketball player

Dame Lois Muir DNZM OBE
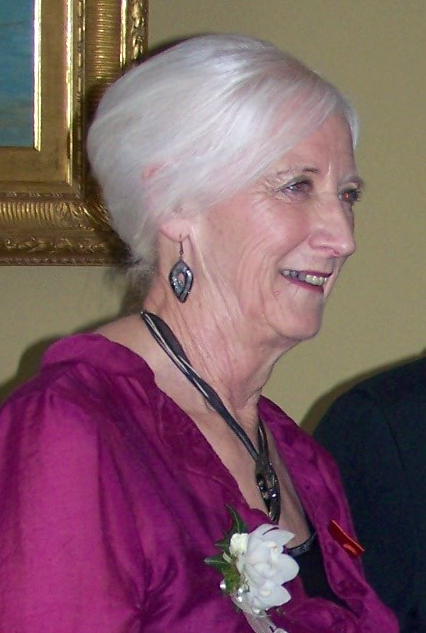
- Muir in 2009

Personal information
- Full name: Lois Joan Muir (née Osborne)
- Born: 16 April 1935 (age 91) Mataura, New Zealand
- Spouse: Murray Muir (m. 1955; died 2004)

Netball career
| Years | National team | Caps |
| 1960–1963 | New Zealand | |
Coaching career
- Years: Team
- 2001–2005: Otago Rebels
- 1998–2000: Capital Shakers
- 1974–1988: New Zealand
Medal record
Representing New Zealand
World Netball Tournament
| Silver medal – second place | 1963 Eastbourne | Netball |

Dame Lois Joan Muir DNZM OBE (née Osborne; born 16 April 1935) is a New Zealand netball coach and administrator, and a former representative netball and basketball player. Muir represented New Zealand in two sports, playing with the Tall Ferns from 1952 to 1962 and the Silver Ferns, player #27, from 1960 to 1963. She later became head coach (#4) of the Silver Ferns for 15 years from 1974 to 1988.

During this time she coached the Silver Ferns to World Championships gold in 1979 (jointly with Australia and Trinidad and Tobago) and in 1987.

Born in Mataura on 16 April 1935, Muir was educated at Gore High School. In 1949, at the age of 14, she played her first National game when her Southland Center Netball team won their regional tournament and then went on to the National competition. She later attended Otago Girls' High School in Dunedin.

In 1955, she married Murray Muir, and the couple went on to have three children.

Muir was appointed an Officer of the Order of the British Empire, for services to netball, in the 1984 New Year Honours, and was inducted into the New Zealand Sports Hall of Fame in 1993. With the start of the Coca-Cola Cup (later the National Bank Cup) in 1998, she became coach of the Capital Shakers team.

In August 1998, Muir was diagnosed with breast cancer. She continued to coach the Shakers until the end of the 2000 season. She also took up a coaching position with the Otago Rebels until the end of 2005.

In the 2004 Queen's Birthday Honours, Muir was appointed as a Distinguished Companion of the New Zealand Order of Merit in recognition of services to sports administration and netball. She accepted redesignation as a Dame Companion of the New Zealand Order of Merit in 2009, following the restoration of titular honours by the New Zealand government.

In 2024, in celebration of the centennial of Netball New Zealand, Muir was named as one of the inaugural 12 inductees to the Netball New Zealand Hall of Fame, and was one of three who were elevated to Icon status.

Awards
| Preceded by Brian Lochore | Halberg Awards – Coach of the Year; 1988 | Succeeded by Lyn Parker |
