= Margaret Forsyth =

New Zealand netball player and coach (1961–2021)

Margaret Forsyth ONZM
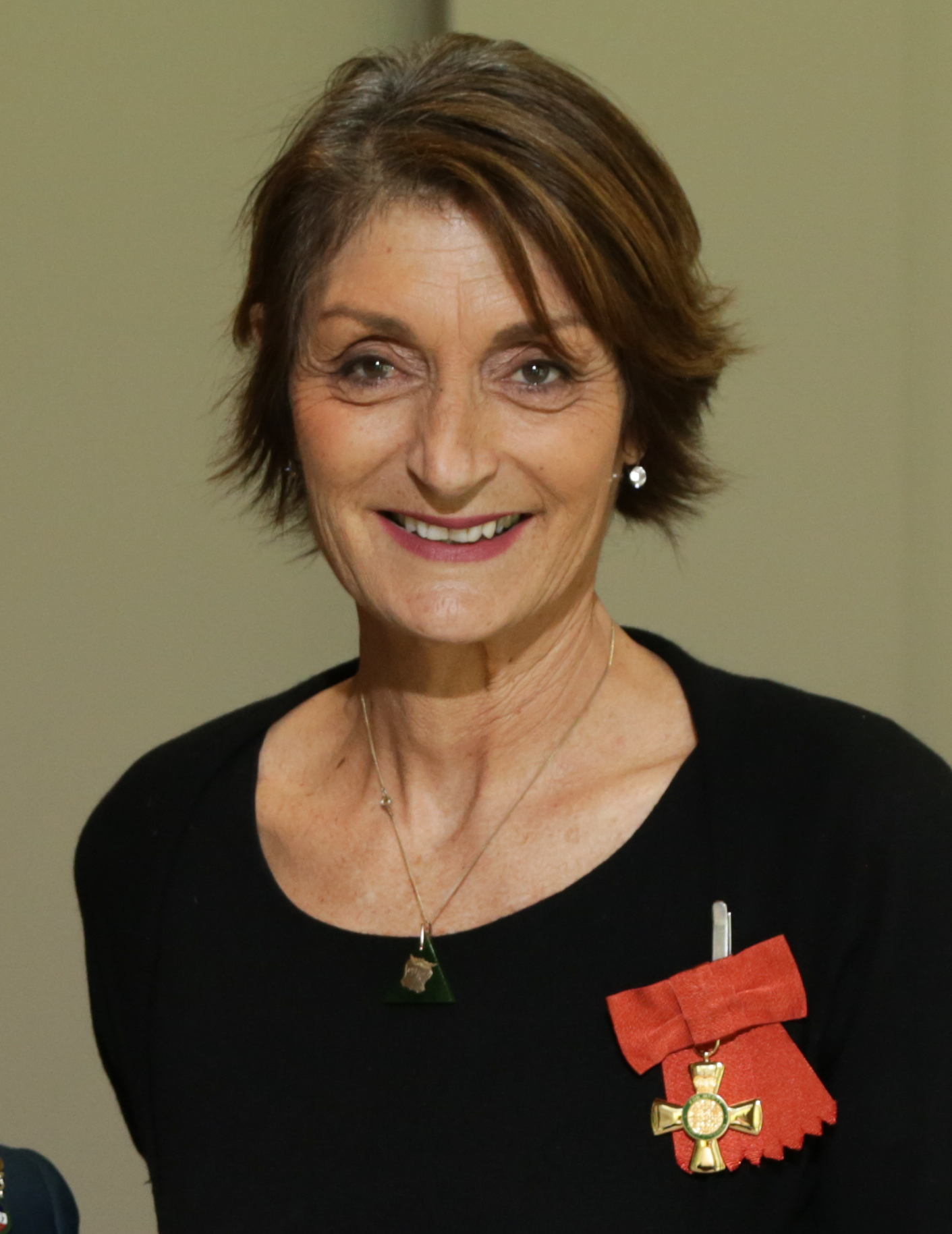
- Forsyth in 2020

Personal information
- Full name: Margaret Hine Forsyth
- Born: 28 December 1961 Hamilton, New Zealand
- Died: 4 May 2021 (aged 59)

Netball career
- Playing position: GA
Years	National team	Caps
1979–1987	New Zealand	64
Coaching career
- Years: Team
- 2017–2021: Waikato Bay of Plenty Magic
Medal record
Representing New Zealand
World Netball Tournament
Gold medal – first place	1979 Port of Spain	Tournament
Gold medal – first place	1987 Glasgow	Tournament
Silver medal – second place	1983 Singapore	Tournament
- Updated on 31 December 2019

Margaret Hine Forsyth ONZM (28 December 1961 – 4 May 2021) was a New Zealand track and field athlete, netball player, coach, and politician.

Born in Hamilton, she was selected for the New Zealand national netball team, the Silver Ferns, in 1979 at the age of 17 while a pupil at Hillcrest High School. Victory at the 1979 World Netball Tournament made Forsyth the youngest Silver Fern World Champion in history.

Throughout the 1980s, Forsyth formed a notable attacking partnership with fellow Silver Ferns shooter Margharet Matenga, known together as the "two Margs". She continued with the team until 1987, competing at three World Netball Tournaments.

With her playing style, winning record, and position on the 1987 World Champion Silver Ferns team, Forsyth had a notable career. Her career ultimately ended in early retirement due to knee injury.

== Coaching career ==
In 2014 Forsyth was named assistant coach of the Waikato Bay of Plenty Magic competing in the ANZ Championship. In 2017 the Magic joined the new ANZ Premiership competition, and Forsyth was promoted to head coach of the team.

In 2016, Forsyth was named Coach of the NZA Netball Team and in 2017 she was Assistant Coach of the New Zealand FAST5 Ferns.

In 2020, Forsyth took up the position of Assistant Coach with Auckland-based franchise, The Northern Mystix. In the 2021, the team won their first National Netball Championships while Forsyth underwent treatment for cancer. Captain Sulu Fitzpatrick dedicated the title win to Forsyth.

== Political career ==
Forsyth served as a City Councillor for the city of Hamilton, New Zealand between 2010-2016 and 2019-2021.

== New Zealand Order of Merit ==
In the 2020 New Year Honours, she was appointed an Officer of the New Zealand Order of Merit, for services to netball and the community.

She died on 4 May 2021, aged 59, shortly after being diagnosed with cancer.
