= Netball New Zealand =

Governing body of New Zealand netball

- Founded: 1925
- CEO: David Cooper (acting)

Official website
- www.netballnz.co.nz
- (New Zealand)

Netball New Zealand is the national body which oversees, promotes and manages netball in New Zealand, including the Silver Ferns.

In 2019, 137,713 players were registered with Netball New Zealand, the governing body for organised netball in the country. Organised competition ranges from interschool and local club netball to premier domestic competitions such as the ANZ Premiership, with the pinnacle for netball players in New Zealand being selection for the national team.

Netball New Zealand is the governing body that oversees organised netball competition at school, club, regional, national and international level in New Zealand. It was founded from the New Zealand Basketball Association, which was established in 1924, and has helped to organise standard rules of play both internationally and within New Zealand.

Netball New Zealand oversees New Zealand's five netball zones; Netball Northern, Netball Waikato Bay of Plenty, Netball Central, Netball Mainland and Netball South. At a national level, Netball New Zealand looks after all the domestic competitions/teams and major events. In elite domestic netball, Netball New Zealand also supervises the six ANZ Premiership franchises and the national team, the Silver Ferns.

Organised netball in New Zealand usually starts at local club or school level at around 5–7 years of age. At this stage, players focus on learning the rules of the game, as well as ball skills and basic game play. Fully competitive netball begins at around 13 years of age, although interschool competition often starts during primary school. At this stage, young players can play for a school team or for an out-of-school club team. School teams compete against other school teams in their region, with the best four teams from each of three national 'regions' competing in the annual New Zealand Secondary School Championships. Exceptional players can be invited to participate in a development camp, from which the New Zealand Secondary Schools team is chosen.

Players in out-of-school club competition compete in regional and regional-representative (national) competitions. Regional development programmes allow selected players to compete in U-15 and U-17 national competitions. After this, players may trial for entry into the New Zealand U-19 and U-21 teams, which compete at the New Zealand Age Group Championships. Open-age regional competition can, for talented players, lead to competing in the New Zealand Netball Championships. Successful players can be chosen to play in a franchise in the ANZ Premiership. From this point, the highest levels of netball in New Zealand are selection for the New Zealand Accelerant squad, and ultimately the New Zealand national team, the Silver Ferns.

== Governance ==
Netball New Zealand is the governing body that oversees organised netball competition at school, club, regional, national and international level in New Zealand. It was founded from the New Zealand Basketball Association, which was established in 1924, and has helped to organise standard rules of play both internationally and within New Zealand.

Netball New Zealand oversees New Zealand's five netball zones; Netball Northern, Netball Waikato Bay of Plenty, Netball Central, Netball Mainland and Netball South. At a national level, Netball New Zealand looks after all the domestic competitions/teams and major events. In elite domestic netball, Netball New Zealand also supervises the six ANZ Premiership franchises and the national team, the Silver Ferns. Junior netball competition in Wellington. Organised netball in New Zealand usually starts at local club or school level at around 5–7 years of age. At this stage, players focus on learning the rules of the game, as well as ball skills and basic game play. Fully competitive netball begins at around 13 years of age, although interschool competition often starts during primary school. At this stage, young players can play for a school team or for an out-of-school club team. School teams compete against other school teams in their region, with the best four teams from each of three national 'regions' competing in the annual New Zealand Secondary School Championships. Exceptional players can be invited to participate in a development camp, from which the New Zealand Secondary Schools team is chosen.

Players in out-of-school club competition compete in regional and regional-representative (national) competitions. Regional development programmes allow selected players to compete in U-15 and U-17 national competitions. After this, players may trial for entry into the New Zealand U-19 and U-21 teams, which compete at the New Zealand Age Group Championships. Open-age regional competition can, for talented players, lead to competing in the New Zealand Netball Championships. Successful players can be chosen to play in a franchise in the ANZ Premiership. From this point, the highest levels of netball in New Zealand are selection for the New Zealand Accelerant squad, and ultimately the New Zealand national team, the Silver Ferns. :)

== Junior netball ==
=== Mother Earth futureFERNS ===
The official junior netball programme of Netball New Zealand for year 1 – year 8. To ignite a lifelong involvement in Netball, a sequential programme has been developed that is at the right level for the players at each stage. The emphasis is on fun activities conducted in a safe environment. Small sided games are the preferred training method and are proven to be the most appropriate way to enhance skill and tactical development.

=== Player Development Programme (PDP) ===
Year 7 & 8 is an extension programme designed to broaden the talent pool and inspire a lifelong love of Netball. It replaces the representative programme previously offered. The PDP provides more opportunities for more players to develop and extend their technical, tactical and athlete development skills.

== Domestic competitions ==
The first national netball competition in New Zealand was held in 1926.

Presently, the three main national netball tournaments are the National Netball League, the New Zealand Age Group Championships and the New Zealand Secondary School Championships. The National Netball League are contested between regional-representative teams, and provide players for the ANZ Premiership franchises. U-19 and U-21 teams compete at the New Zealand Age Group Championships. The New Zealand Secondary School Championships provides players for the New Zealand Secondary Schools team.

=== National Netball League ===
The National Netball League is fundamental to strengthening Netball New Zealand's performance pathway, the development of talent, and competitiveness of Netball New Zealand's elite teams. The league consists of 31 games run over 13 weekends, allowing players to continue with work and study commitments, culminating in a Grand Final. The competition includes six teams playing a double round-robin, with 10 matches to be televised on SKY Sport and 21 standalone games.

=== NZ Secondary Schools Netball Champs ===
Established in 1993, the New Zealand Secondary Schools (NZSS) Netball Champs is one of the most hotly contested annual tournaments on the Netball New Zealand calendar. The event provides an opportunity for the best secondary school teams from the Upper North Island, Lower North Island and South Island to go head-to-head in a battle for the trophy.

=== Netball NZ Championships ===
The Netball New Zealand Under-19 Championships, established in 1993, is an annual indoor tournament involving regional netball centres from across New Zealand. Typically, between 15 and 20 teams compete over four days. The competition serves as a development event for players, as well as for coaches, umpires, and officials.

U17: The Netball NZ U17 Champs (est. 2009) is Netball New Zealand's largest event and continues to grow in popularity. Between 32 and 40 Netball Centres compete in this four-day, outdoor tournament – the only domestic event held outdoors. The event is a key stepping stone for players along the development pathway.

From 2020, Netball New Zealand announced that the Netball NZ U19 and U17 Champs would be replaced by the Netball NZ U18 Champs and the Netball NZ Open Champs.

== ANZ Premiership competition ==
=== National Bank Cup, 1998–2008 ===
Elite domestic netball competition emerged in 1998, when the Coca-Cola Cup was changed into a franchise-based competition, with ten new teams representing 12 regional areas. After four years, the competition was renamed the "National Bank Cup". Over its ten-year run, the competition was dominated by the Southern Sting. The final season was played in 2007, with the Southern Sting winning their seventh title. It was replaced in 2008 by a new trans-Tasman competition, the ANZ Championship.

=== ANZ Championship, 2008–2016 ===
The ANZ Championship was inaugurated in April 2008 as the premier domestic netball competition in both New Zealand and Australia. The competition comprises ten teams, five each from New Zealand and Australia. The ANZ Championship allowed netball to become a semi-professional sport in both New Zealand and Australia.

ANZ Championship franchises
Franchise		Representative area
New Zealand	Northern Mystics	Northland, Auckland-Waitakere, Counties Manukau
New Zealand	Waikato/Bay of Plenty Magic	Waikato, Bay of Plenty
New Zealand	Central Pulse	Central North Island, Wellington, Tasman
New Zealand	Canterbury Tactix	Canterbury
New Zealand	Southern Steel	Otago, Southland
Australia	New South Wales Swifts	New South Wales
Australia	Melbourne Vixens	Melbourne (Victoria)
Australia	Queensland Firebirds	Queensland
Australia	Adelaide Thunderbirds	Adelaide (South Australia)
Australia	West Coast Fever	Western Australia

=== ANZ Premiership, 2017–present ===
The ANZ Premiership is the premier domestic netball league in New Zealand. The league was formed in 2016 as a successor to the trans-Tasman ANZ Championship, which was held from 2008 to 2016. The ANZ Premiership is contested annually by six teams based throughout New Zealand, with a total of 47 games played over 14 weeks.

The inaugural season of the ANZ Premiership was played in 2017, with the Southern Steel emerging as champions. The 2018 season commenced in May 2018.

Teams in the ANZ Premiership
Team	Colours	Established	Base	Main venue*	Head coach
Northern Mystics		2008	Auckland	The Trusts Arena	Helene Wilson
Northern Stars		2017	Auckland	Bruce Pulman Park	Kiri Wills
Waikato Bay of Plenty Magic		1999	Hamilton	Claudelands Arena	Margaret Forsyth
Central Pulse		2008	Wellington	TSB Bank Arena	Yvette McCausland-Durie
Mainland Tactix		1998	Christchurch	Horncastle Arena	Marianne Delaney-Hoshek
Southern Steel		2008	Invercargill	ILT Stadium Southland	Reinga Bloxham

== Major events ==
Netball New Zealand has several major events throughout the year:

SuperClub

Super Club, an international competition featuring eight teams from all over the world. The top three New Zealand teams from the ANZ Premiership will qualify for the event, as well as some of the top club teams from around the world.

Netball Quad Series

This series is contested by four of the five highest ranked nations in netball.

Netball Youth World Cup

Since the inception of the four-yearly tournament in 1988, it was the first time New Zealand had won back-to-back titles, toppling old rivals Australia by three goals in the final of the 2017 edition to clinch a fourth trophy.

Constellation Cup

The Constellation Cup is contested by the Australian national netball team and the New Zealand national netball team. It is awarded each year to the team that wins the most test matches between the two, excluding games played as part of multinational tournaments such as the Netball World Championships and Commonwealth Games.

Taini Jamison Trophy

The Taini Jamison Trophy was introduced in 2008 in honour of the coach of the winning New Zealand team in the 1967 Netball World Championships, Taini Jamison, and is contested when any netballing nation – other than Australia – plays the Silver Ferns on New Zealand soil.

Commonwealth Games

Netball was introduced into the Commonwealth Games in 1998 and has been an integral part of the programme since.

INF Netball World Cup

The INF Netball World Cup is a quadrennial international netball world championship co-ordinated by the International Netball Federation (INF), inaugurated in 1963. Since its inception the competition has been dominated primarily by the Australian national netball team (the Diamonds) and the New Zealand national netball team (the Silver Ferns) – Trinidad and Tobago is the only other team to have won a title.

Fast5 Netball World Series

The Fast5 Netball World Series is an international netball competition that was contested for the first time in October 2009. The new competition features modified "Fast5" rules, and has been likened to Twenty20 cricket and rugby sevens. The competition is contested by the six top national netball teams in the world, according to the INF World Rankings.

== National teams ==
=== Silver Ferns ===
The Silver Ferns are often the national focus for netball in New Zealand. They are the second highest rank team in the INF World Rankings.

=== Other national teams ===
Fastnet Ferns / Fast5 Ferns

The Fastnet Ferns represent New Zealand at the World Netball Series, a recently developed international competition played under fastnet rules. In 2010, the New Zealand team sent to the World Netball Series comprised players from the wider Silver Ferns squad, as well as non-international players. Robyn Broughton was appointed head coach of the 2010 Fastnet Ferns.

Silver Ferns Development Squad

The Silver Ferns Development Squad is the second tier squad for the Silver Ferns. Players in this squad are selected from domestic competitions such as the ANZ Premiership and are recognised as being potential members of the Silver Ferns. 10–15 players are expected to be in Silver Ferns Development Squad at any given time, which will be supervised by Silver Ferns head coach.

New Zealand U21

The New Zealand U21 team includes players under 21 years of age that are considered to have the potential to progress to higher levels of netball in the future. Players are selected from domestic netball competitions.

New Zealand Secondary Schools

The New Zealand Secondary Schools team includes talented players of secondary school age. Players are selected from a development camp after the New Zealand Secondary Schools Championships.

== International netball ==
The Silver Ferns regularly compete with other national netball teams, both in tours and in one-match tests. The Silver Ferns also compete in test series and in world championships, which are usually televised in New Zealand. The New Zealand A, New Zealand U21 and New Zealand Secondary Schools teams also compete internationally.

=== INF Netball World Cup ===
The INF Netball World Cup represents the highest level of competitive netball in the world. The Silver Ferns have competed at each tournament, the first of which started in 1963. New Zealand has won three Championships – in 1967, 1987 and 2003 – and have always finished in the top three places. The majority of finals have been contested between New Zealand and Australia.

=== Commonwealth Games ===
Netball has been a core sport in the Commonwealth Games since 1998. New Zealand and Australia have contested all four gold medal matches: Australia won the gold medal in 1998 and 2002, while New Zealand has won gold in 2006 and 2010. The gold medal matches in 2002 and 2010 were two of the most closely contested matches in netball history, both going into double extra time. 2018 Commonwealth Games had the England Roses take the home the gold medal for the first time in the competition with Australia taking the silver. New Zealand placed fourth.

=== Test matches ===
Regular home series have been played in New Zealand since 1986. Teams such as Australia, England, South Africa and Jamaica play regular test matches against New Zealand, with occasional matches against other national teams, in particular from Pacific Island nations. Both Netball Quad Series and Constellation Cup are played on New Zealand soil.

== Media coverage ==
Netball receives wide media coverage in New Zealand. Regular television coverage of netball games in New Zealand began in the 1960s, and in the 1980s netball was included in the 'big four' sports – along with rugby union, rugby league and cricket – that received increased coverage from Television New Zealand, as well as being exempt from paying for broadcast time, and even receiving a minimal 'rights fee'.

Domestic matches in the ANZ Premiership are televised live on SKY Sports, which also televised the ANZ Championship and National Bank Cup; delayed coverage is broadcast by both SKY Sports and TVNZ New Zealand.

The final of the 1999 Netball World Championships between New Zealand and Australia was, at the time, the highest rating programme ever for then-televisor TV2. Another trans-Tasman Silver Ferns match in 2008 attracted a higher television audience than for the deciding rugby union match of the Bledisloe Cup earlier that year.
