= Kerslake =

Kerslake is a surname. Notable people with the surname include:

- Bob Kerslake (1955–2023), Head of the Home Civil Service in the UK
- Camilla Kerslake (born 1988), English classical crossover singer from London
- David Kerslake (born 1966), English professional footballer
- Doug Kerslake (1950–2015), Canadian professional ice hockey player
- Ken Kerslake (1930–2007), American artist and printmaker
- Kevin Kerslake, American music video director
- Lee Kerslake (1947–2020), English musician with the rock band Uriah Heep
- Phil Kerslake (1959–2021), Welsh-born New Zealand leadership coach, speaker, author and TV presenter
- Roy Kerslake (born 1942), English cricketer
- Seána Kerslake (born 1990), Irish actress from Tallaght
- Simon Kerslake, fictional character in the political novel First Among Equals by Jeffrey Archer
- Thomas Kerslake (1812–1891), English bookseller and antiquarian
- William Kerslake (1929–2015), American Olympic heavyweight wrestler and NASA engineer

== See also ==
- Kerslake Hall, residential college for full-time students of the University of Tasmania and Australian Maritime College
