= 2014 New Year Honours (New Zealand) =

Annual awards for New Zealanders

- Previous: 2013 New Zealand bravery awards Next: 2014 Special Honours
- Type: New Zealand royal honours: New Zealand Order of Merit; Royal Victorian Order; Queen's Service Order; Queen's Service Medal; New Zealand Distinguished Service Decoration
- Date: 31 December 2013
- Country: New Zealand
- Total recipients: 179

The 2014 New Year Honours in New Zealand were appointments by Elizabeth II in her right as Queen of New Zealand, on the advice of the New Zealand government, to various orders and honours to reward and highlight good works by New Zealanders, and to celebrate the passing of 2013 and the beginning of 2014. They were announced on 31 December 2013.

The recipients of honours are displayed here as they were styled before their new honour.

== New Zealand Order of Merit ==
=== Dame Companion (DNZM) ===
- Trelise Pamela Cooper MNZM – of Auckland. For services to fashion and the community.
- Alison Mae Paterson CNZM QSO – of Auckland. For services to business.
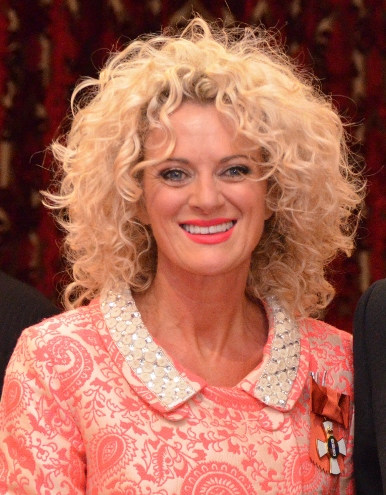
Dame Trelise Cooper

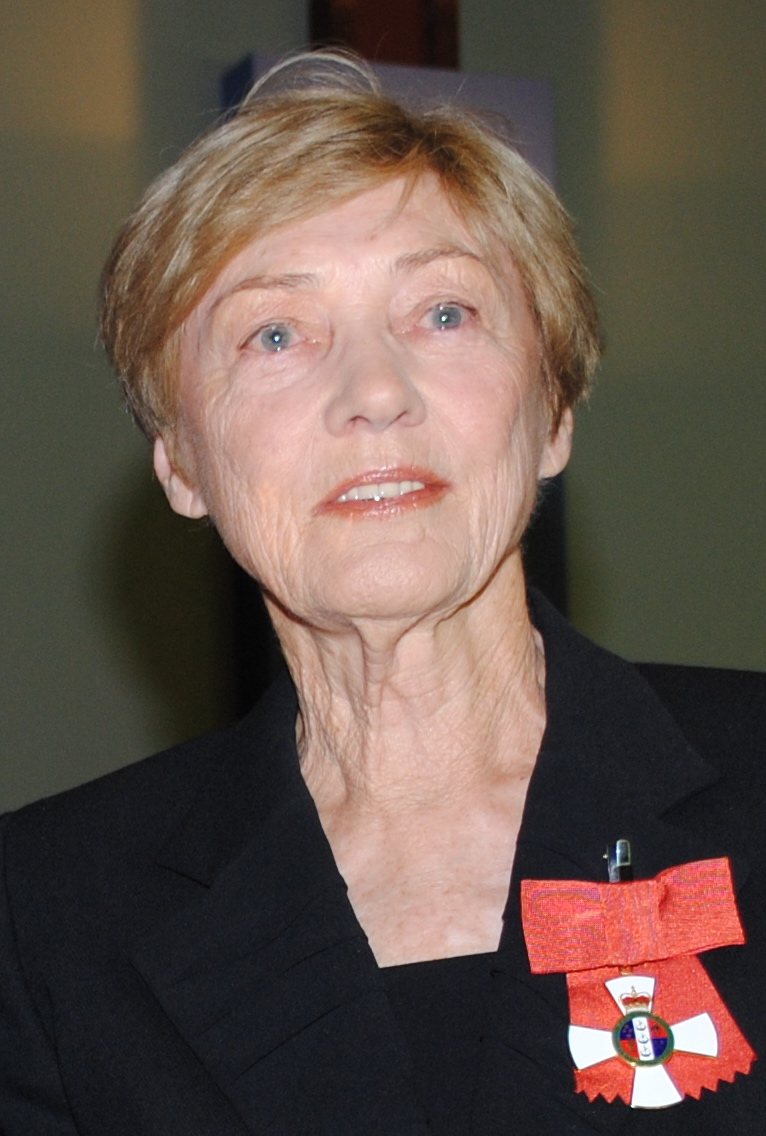
Dame Alison Paterson

=== Knight Companion (KNZM) ===
- Dr Noble Thomson Curtis – of Rotorua. For services to Māori education.
- The Most Reverend Archbishop David John Moxon – of Rome, Italy. For services to the Anglican Church.
- Robert John Parker – of Christchurch. For services to local-body affairs and the community.
- Peter James Vela ONZM – of Hamilton. For services to the Thoroughbred industry.
Sir Toby Curtis

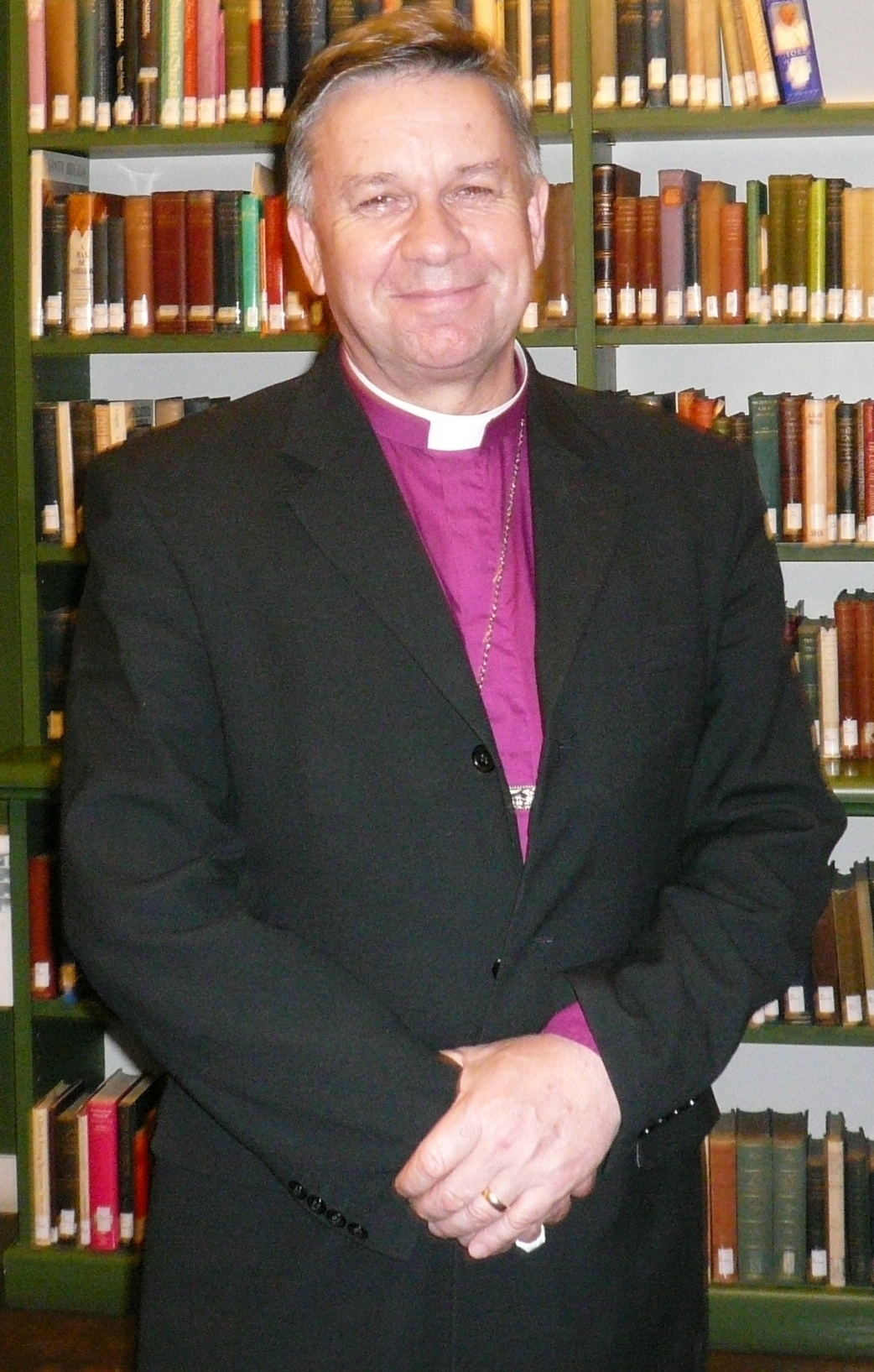
Sir David Moxon

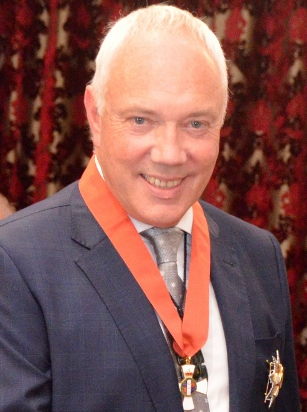
Sir Bob Parker

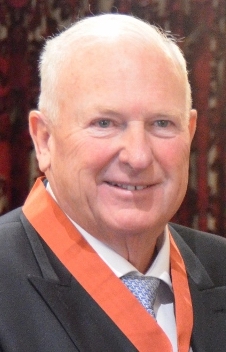
Sir Peter Vela

=== Companion (CNZM) ===
- Richard Miller Ballantyne – of Christchurch. For services to business and the community.
- Frana Grace Cardno QSO – of Te Anau. For services to local government.
- Alastair Kinloch Carruthers – of Auckland. For services to arts governance.
- The Honourable Lester Hugh Chisholm – of Christchurch. For services to the judiciary.
- Peter Charles Cooper – of Los Angeles, United States of America. For services to urban redevelopment.
- Professor Cynthia Margaret Farquhar MNZM – of Auckland. For services to women's health.
- Earl Raymond Hagaman – of Christchurch. For services to business, tourism and philanthropy.
- Lieutenant General Richard Rhys Jones – of Wellington. For services to the State.
- Donald Mitchell McKenzie OBE – of Waiheke Island. For services to physiotherapy and the blind.
- Donald George McLaren ONZM – of Auckland. For services to the animal health industry and racing.
- The Honourable John Maurice Priestley QC – of Auckland. For services to the judiciary.
- John Richard Reid OBE – of Auckland. For services to cricket.
- Peter Ramsay Townsend – of Christchurch. For services to business and the community.
- Karen Elizabeth Walker MNZM – of Auckland. For services to fashion design.

Honorary

- Dr Kurt Michael Campbell – of Washington, D.C., United States of America. For services to New Zealand–United States relations.
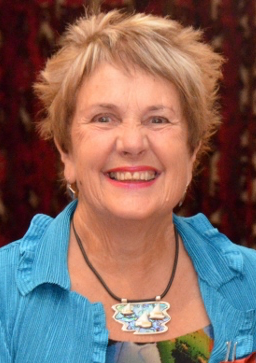
Frana Cardno

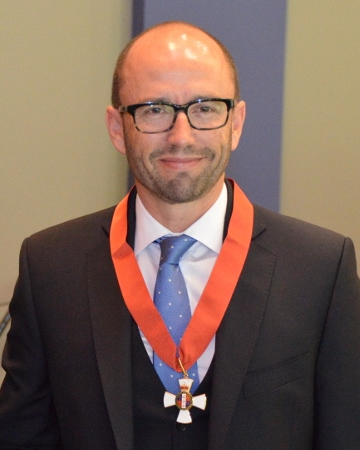
Alastair Carruthers

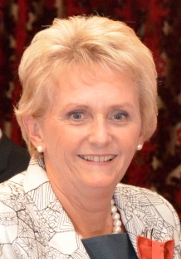
Cindy Farquhar

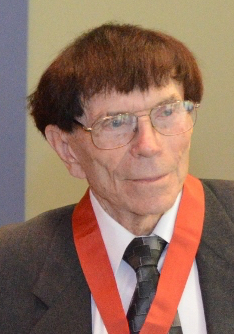
Earl Hagaman

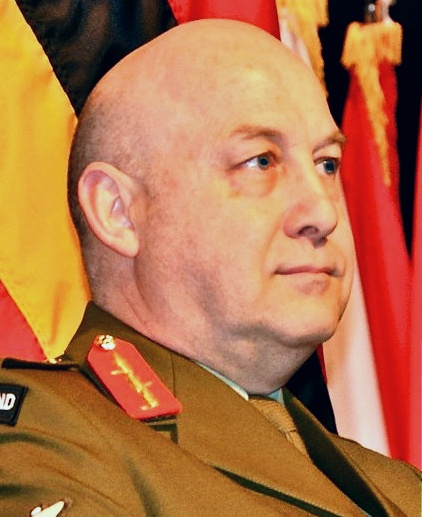
Rhys Jones

Don McLaren

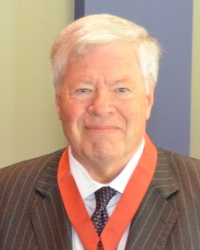
John Priestley

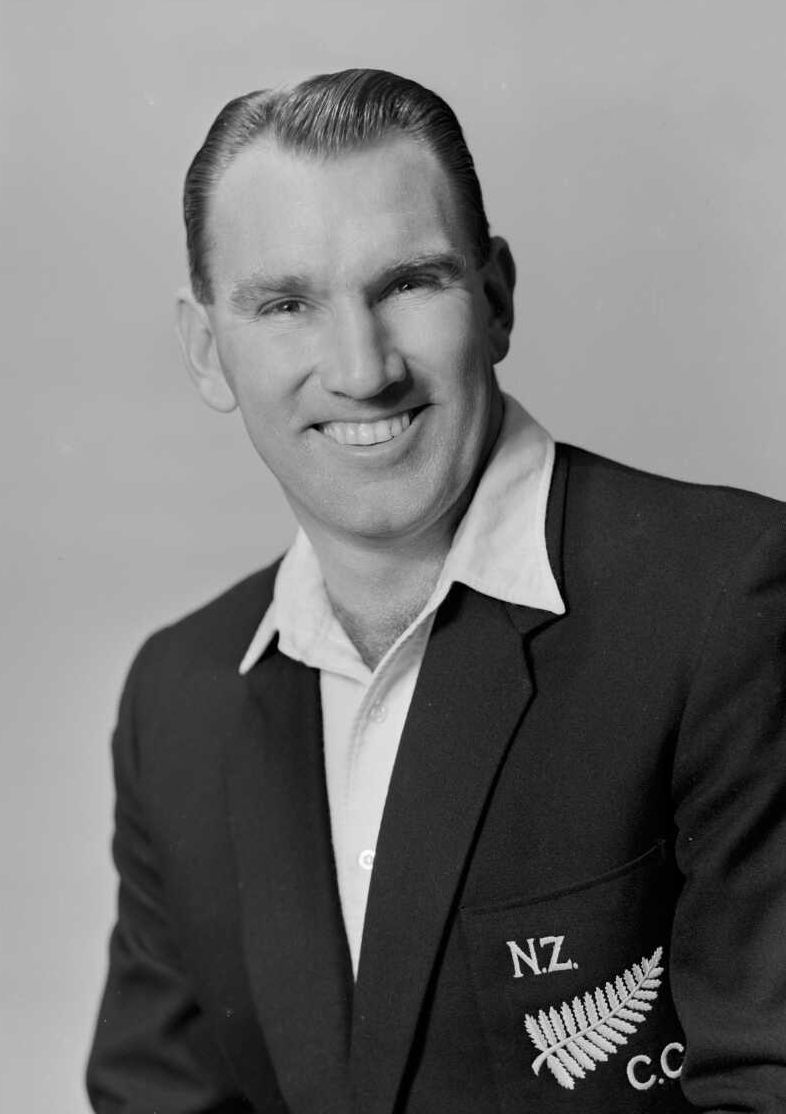
John Reid

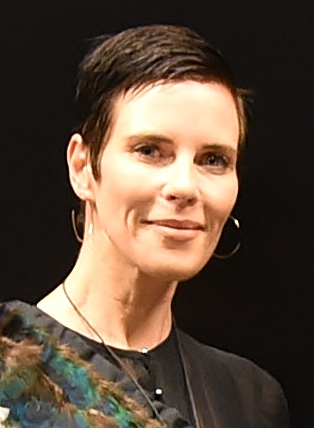
Karen Walker

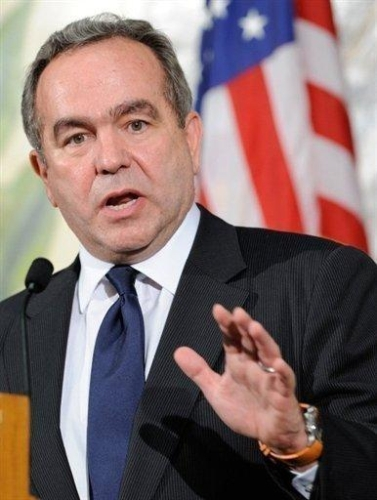
Kurt Campbell

=== Officer (ONZM) ===
- Dr Margaret Rosemary Nelson Agee – of Auckland. For services to mental health education.
- Jane Mary Annear – of Timaru. For services to local government.
- Graham Lindsay Blow – of Wellington. For services to astronomy.
- Peter Savery Braithwaite – of Christchurch. For services to education.
- Ronald Morrison Brown – of Auckland. For services to the transport industry.
- Professor Robert Allan Buckle – of Wellington. For services to business and education.
- Hekenukumai Puhipi Busby MBE – of Whangārei. For services to Māori.
- Adrian Lawrie Buttimore – of Christchurch. For services to the treatment of kidney disease.
- Elizabeth Jean Chesterman – of Christchurch. For services to the Cancer Society of New Zealand.
- John Gordon Coles – of Waimate. For services to local government.
- Ann Kaye Crosby – of Hamilton. For services to business and philanthropy.
- Bernard Thomas Crosby – of Hamilton. For services to business and philanthropy.
- Dr Stephen Latham Goldson – of Christchurch. For services to science.
- Wendy Ruth Hawke – of Auckland. For services to inter-country adoption.
- Marjorie Joe MNZM JP – of Napier. For services to Māori and the community.
- Prudence Ann Kelly – of Wellington. For services to education.
- Thomas Craig Lambie – of Pleasant Point. For services to agriculture.
- Natalie Lavery – of Upper Hutt. For services to senior citizens.
- Alan David Livingston – of Hamilton. For services to sports and the community.
- Dr Tearikivao Maoate – of Christchurch. For services to Pacific health.
- Patrick John McManus – of Westport. For services to local government.
- Susan May Morris – of Taumarunui. For services to local government.
- Professor Stephen Richard Munn – of Auckland. For services to health.
- Geoffrey Peter Murphy – of Wellington. For services to film.
- Maureen Helena Pugh – of Kumara. For services to local government.
- Professor Frederick William Seymour – of Auckland. For services to psychology.
- George Walter Hugh Vercoe QSM ED – of Morrinsville. For services to local government.
- Dale Williams – of Ōtorohanga. For services to local government and youth.
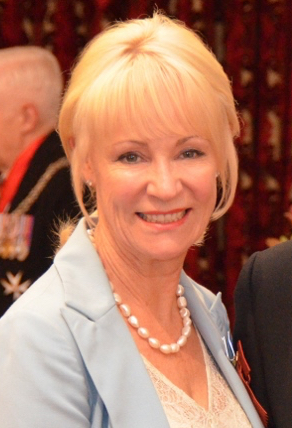
Janie Annear

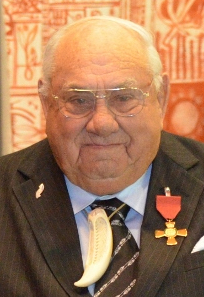
Hec Busby

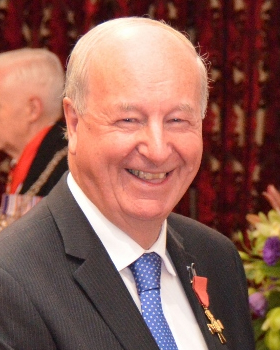
John Coles

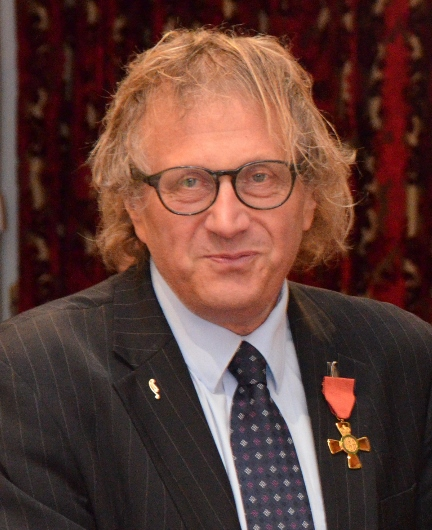
Stephen Goldson

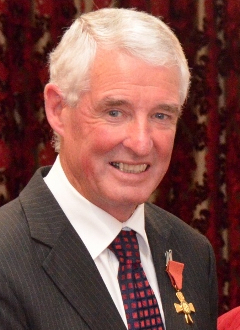
Alan Livingston

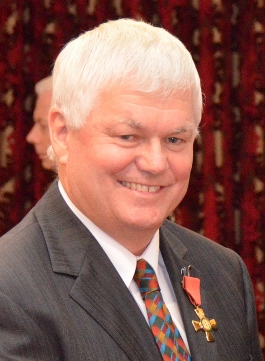
Pat McManus

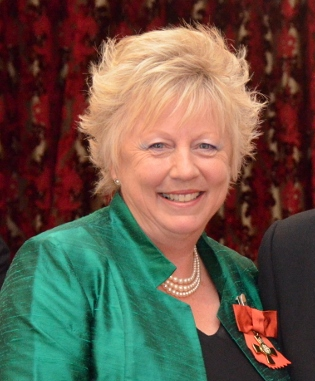
Sue Morris

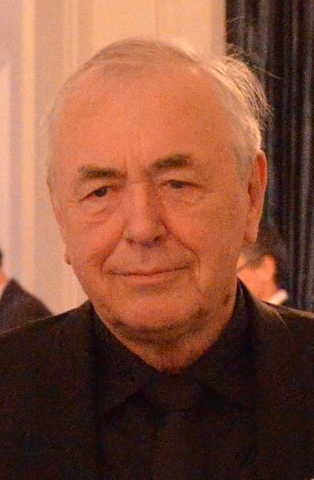
Geoff Murphy

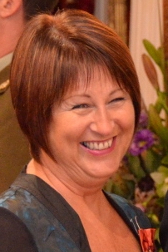
Maureen Pugh

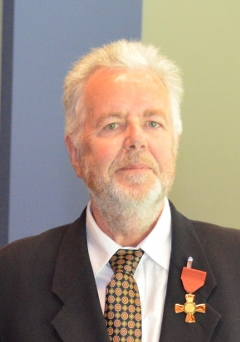
Fred Seymour

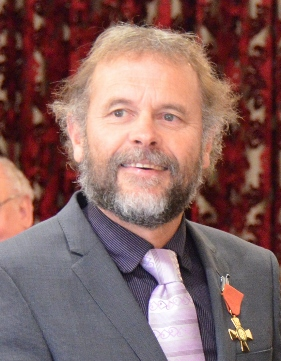
Dale Williams

=== Member (MNZM) ===
- Vailankanni Wenceslaus Melchoir Anthony – of Auckland. For services to New Zealand–India relations.
- Brooke Archbold JP – of Auckland. For services to the Coastguard.
- Douglas Charles Beilman – of Paraparaumu. For services to music.
- Jennifer Mary Bornholdt – of Wellington. For services as a poet.
- Stephen John Boxer – of Manukau. For services to youth.
- Senior Sergeant Ian Thomas Campion – of Tauranga. For services to the New Zealand Police and the community.
- Eleanor Catton – of Auckland. For services to literature.
- Kevin Barry Chapman – of Auckland. For services to publishing.
- Allan Sedman Chisholm – of Paraparaumu. For services to music.
- Dr Harry Clark – of Palmerston North. For services to environmental science.
- Barry Roger Clarke – of Dunedin. For services to the community.
- Michael James Cooney – of Tauranga. For services to the community.
- Peter Courtenay Dale – of Te Horo. For services to sport.
- Emeritus Professor John Frederick Davidson – of Wellington. For services to education and the arts.
- Sheryl Lorene Dawson – of Tauranga. For services to netball.
- Julia Ruth Einhorn – of Waikanae. For services to tertiary education and art.
- Dr Gary Brian Evans – of Lower Hutt. For services to science.
- Alexander William Familton – of Palmerston. For services to local-body government.
- Rita Taimalietane Fatialofa-Patolo – of Auckland. For services to sport.
- Karyn Wendy Fenton-Ellis – of Ngāruawāhia. For services to the community, arts and racing.
- Johanna Mary Frances Galvin (Sister Loyola Galvin) QSM – of Wellington. For services to gardening.
- Dr Rolf Gjelsten – of Wellington. For services to music.
- Priscilla Jean Glasson – of Christchurch. For services to health and the community.
- Francis Roger Maher Hooper – of Auckland. For services to fashion design.
- Patricia Hubbard – of Wellington. For services to early childhood education.
- Kathleen Maureen Te Wehioterangi Jehly – of Rotorua. For services to education and Māori.
- Philip John Keoghan – of Santa Monica, United States of America. For services as a television presenter and to tourism.
- Philip Trevor Kerslake – of Upper Hutt. For services to people with cancer.
- Simon Charles Hayes Leeming – of Canterbury, New Hampshire, United States of America. For services to New Zealand–United States relations.
- Inspector (Ret.) Murray David Lewis – of Tauranga. For services to the New Zealand Police and diplomacy.
- Amoroa Luke – of Blenheim. For services to Māori.
- Peter James McDonald – of Stratford. For services to real estate and the community.
- Ian Edward Mills – of Lower Hutt. For services to civil engineering.
- Ross William Norman – of Sunningdale, United Kingdom. For services to squash.
- Gregory Leo O'Brien – of Wellington. For services to the arts.
- Jeffrey Owen Olsen – of Auckland. For services to the New Zealand Customs Service and sport.
- Dr Allan Leslie Panting – of Nelson. For services to orthopaedics.
- Helene Pohl – of Wellington. For services to music.
- Sergeant Bevan Douglas Seal – of Christchurch. For services to the New Zealand Police and youth.
- Amanda Skoog – of Wellington. For services to ballet.
- Alan Charles Sorrell – of Auckland. For services to film.
- Richard Tayler – of Christchurch. For services to athletics.
- Tutagaloa Tutose Tuhipa – of Auckland. For services to education and the Pacific community.
- Hafeiki Vilitama – of Mutalau, Niue. For services to Niue.
- Robert Craig Walker – of Kumeū. For services to heavy haulage and the community.
- James Leybourne Wallace – of Geraldine. For services to the arts and conservation.
- Wayne Wills – of Auckland. For services to recreational fishing and the community.
- Dr Catherine Ruth Wylie – of Wellington. For services to education.

Additional

- Lieutenant Colonel Duncan George Roy – of Wellington. For services to the New Zealand Defence Force. (Note: Public announcement of Lieutenant Colonel Roy's award was initially withheld for security reasons, but was published on 8 March 2023 in the New Zealand Gazette.)
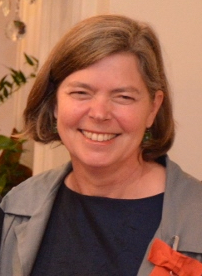
Jenny Bornholdt

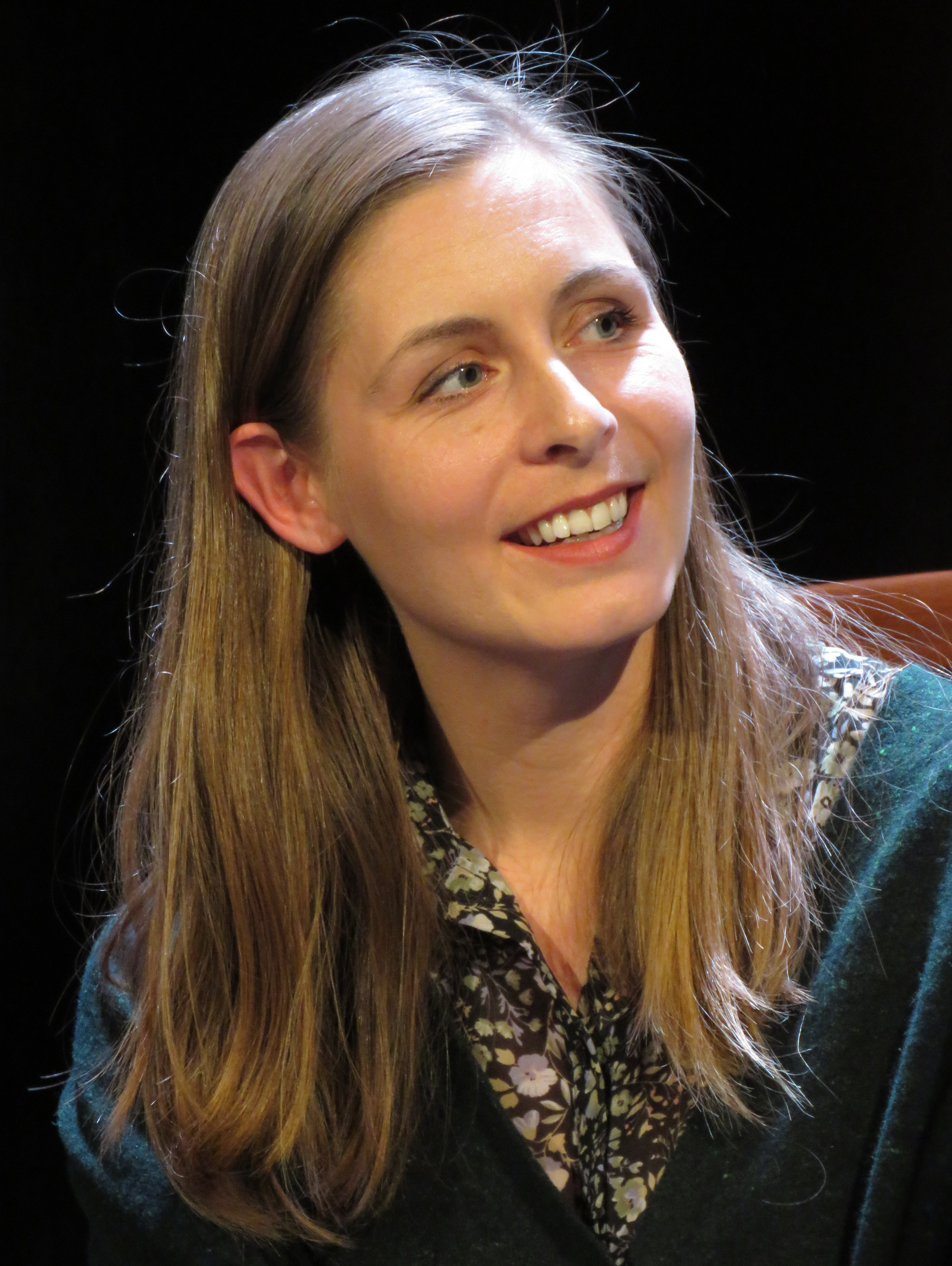
Eleanor Catton

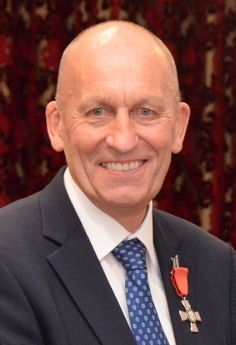
Harry Clark

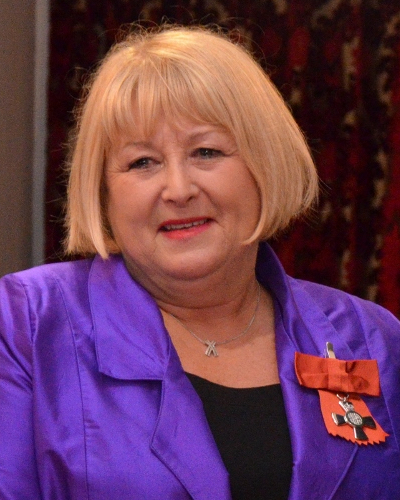
Sheryl Dawson

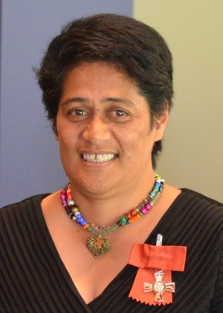
Rita Fatialofa-Patolo

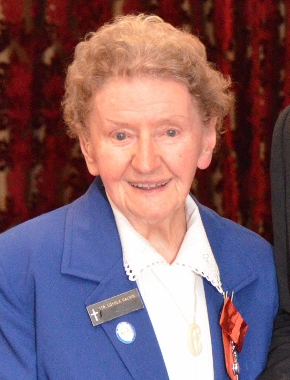
Sister Loyola Galvin

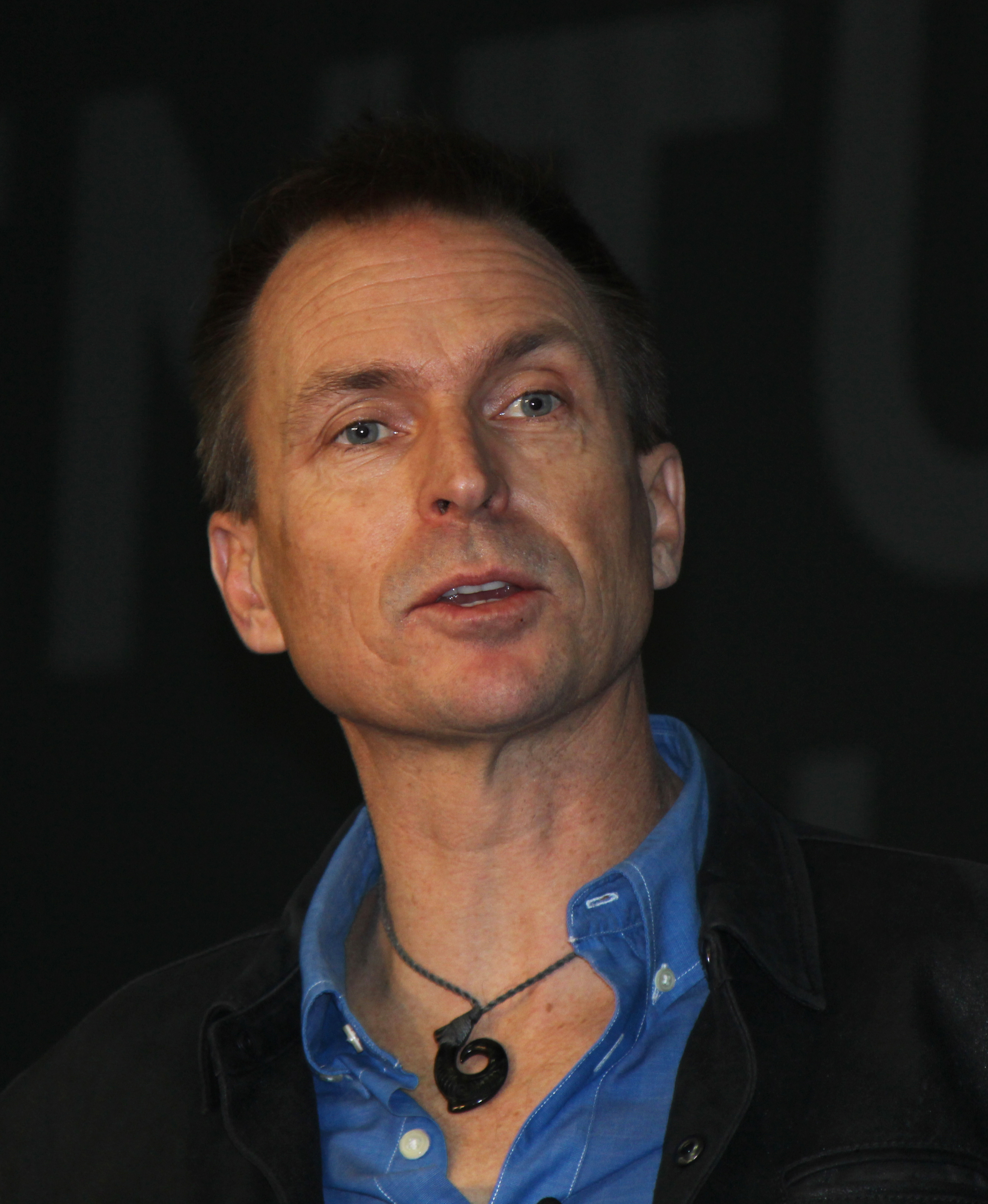
Phil Keoghan

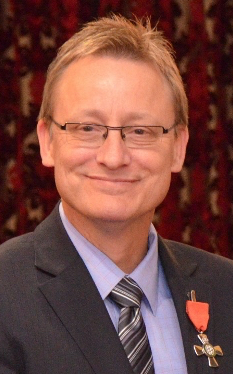
Phil Kerslake

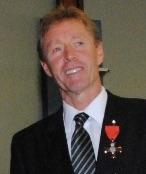
Ross Norman

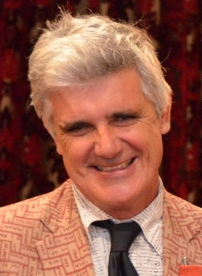
Gregory O'Brien

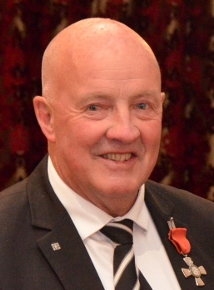
Dick Tayler

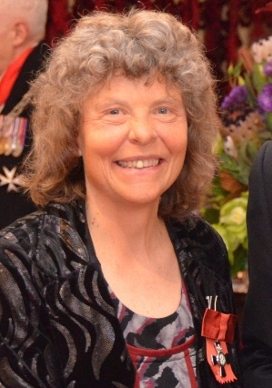
Cathy Wyle

== Royal Victorian Order ==
=== Commander (CVO) ===
- Phillippe Patrick O'Shea CNZM LVO – New Zealand Herald of Arms Extraordinary.
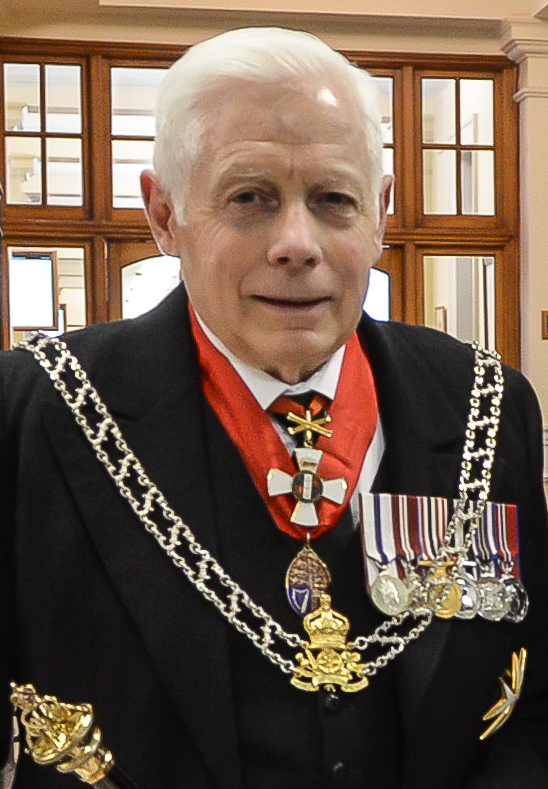
Phillip O'Shea

== Companion of the Queen's Service Order (QSO) ==
- Barbara Wendy Arnott – of Napier. For services to local government and the community.
- Belinda Clark – of Wellington. For services to the State.
- Mary Winifred Harris – of Ōtaki. For services to Parliament
- Neville Owen Harris – of Lower Hutt. For services to the State.
- Rex Edward Hawkins JP – of Taupō. For services to the community.
- William Alexander Moore – of Wellington. For services to the State.
- John Chester Pike QC – of Wellington. For services to the law.
- Laurel Heather Taufauata – of Auckland. For services to health and the Pacific community.
- Judge Barrie Stephen Travis – of Auckland. For services to the judiciary.
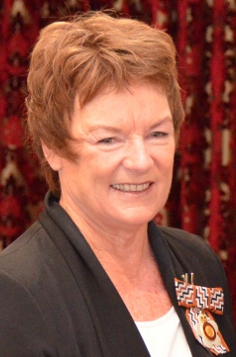
Barbara Arnott

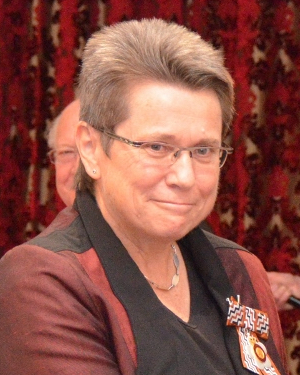
Mary Harris

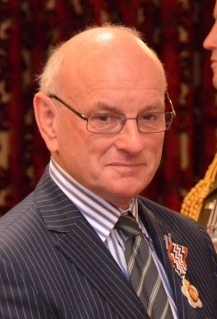
John Pike

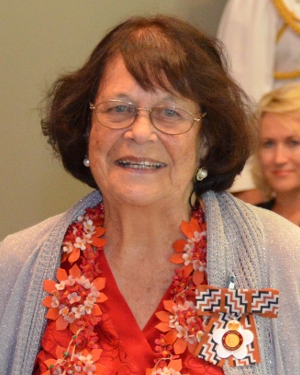
Laurel Taufauata

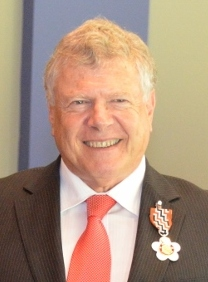
Barrie Travis

== Queen's Service Medal (QSM) ==
- Mervyn Roxford Ah Chee – of Auckland. For services to hospitality and the community.
- Brian Maxwell Arons – of Wellington. For services to the New Zealand Fire Service.
- Gretl Bass – of Auckland. For services to the community.
- Stuart James Batty JP – of Christchurch. For services to the community.
- Derek Beveridge – of Oamaru. For services to the community.
- Kingiareta Richard Biddle – of Rotorua. For services to Māori and mental health.
- Helen Louise Blake – of Levin. For services to philanthropy.
- Bruce Eiohan Brownlie – of Feilding. For services to aviation and health.
- Richard Charles Cashmore – of Tauranga. For services to business, sport and the community.
- Christine Chambers – of Whakatāne. For services to the community.
- Reverend Judith Anne Cooper – of Auckland. For services to Māori arts and the community.
- Colin Ian Crombie – of Napier. For services to philanthropy.
- Manoj Daji – of Auckland. For services to sport and education.
- George Bruce Darvill – of Paeroa. For services to the community.
- Garry Dockary – of Hastings. For services to the New Zealand Fire Service.
- Janet McLeod Forbes – of Wellington. For services to prisoner rehabilitation programmes.
- Janet Margaret Froggatt – of Dargaville. For services to the community.
- Norah Fryer – of Auckland. For services to early childhood education.
- Merle Chalwyn Gibson – of Richmond. For services to music and the community.
- Murray David Giera – of Christchurch. For services to the community. (Note: Deceased. Her Majesty's approval of this award took effect on 19 November 2013, prior to the date of decease.)
- Mark Christopher Grantham – of Auckland. For services to the community.
- John Morris Green – of Rotorua. For services to conservation.
- Christopher John Haines – of Invercargill. For services to education.
- Lynette Anne Holland JP – of Christchurch. For services to education and the community.
- Raymond Andrew Johnston – of Pukekohe. For services to the community.
- Stephen Andrew Johnston – of Christchurch. For services to surf life saving.
- Joan Charlotte Franceska Kennett – of Palmerston North. For services to early childhood education.
- Dr Harry John Kerr – of Hastings. For services to health and the community.
- Murray Allan Kidd JP – of Auckland. For services to the community.
- Candy Michele Lane – of Auckland. For services to dance.
- Janice Ann Lewis – of Tauranga. For services to the New Zealand Police and women's health.
- Wendy Logan – of Nelson. For services to early childhood education.
- Xiao-Jun Lu – of Manukau. For services to the Chinese community.
- Han Leang Ly – of Auckland. For services to the Cambodian Chinese community.
- David John Mackie JP – of Clinton. For services to the community.
- John Roger Macnaughtan JP – of Auckland. For services to New Zealand–Russia relations.
- Joan Elsie Marks – of Whangaparāoa. For services to the community.
- Robert George Maskill – of Greymouth. For services to education.
- Alan John McLay – of Oamaru. For services to the community.
- Dr Logan James Ewart McLennan – of Porirua. For services to health and education.
- Jacqueline Nuki McVinnie – of Hamilton. For services to ecclesiastical embroidery.
- Neil Alexander Bisshopp Monro – of Palmerston North. For services to rugby and the community.
- Marguerite Rose Moore – of Westport. For services to women's health.
- Lloyd Henry Morris JP – of Whangārei. For services to the community.
- June Nixey – of Wellington. For services to prisoner rehabilitation programmes.
- Peter Franklin O'Brien – of Auckland. For services to the community.
- Davorin Ivan Ozich – of Auckland. For services to the Croatian community.
- Simon Jigwan Park JP – of Wellington. For services to the Korean community and education.
- Allan Anthony Pengelly – of Auckland. For services to sport and the community.
- Wendy Katrine Pettigrew – of Whanganui. For services to heritage preservation.
- Stephen George Poole JP – of Auckland. For services to the community.
- Kenneth Bruce Popple – of Porirua. For services to the New Zealand Fire Service and the Coastguard.
- Glyn Griffiths Powell – of Auckland. For services to aeronautical heritage preservation.
- Joyce Patricia Prankerd – of Paraparaumu. For services to netball.
- Christopher Bruce Price – of Ashburton. For services to the New Zealand Fire Service.
- Elaine Elsie Sharman – of Lower Hutt. For services to music.
- William Mervyn Shepherd – of Whangārei. For services to hockey and farming.
- Kanagarasa Sivaraj – of Auckland. For services to the community.
- Michael Richard Skerrett JP – of Invercargill. For services to Māori and the community.
- William Huston Smale – of Auckland. For services to education.
- Margaret Anne Stove – of Lyttelton. For services to hand-knitted lace design.
- Linda Tame – of Christchurch. For services to education.
- Janice Margaret Taouma – of Auckland. For services to early childhood education.
- Barbara Joan Taranaki JP – of Cambridge. For services to the community.
- Henry James Towersey – of Whakatāne. For services to the community.
- Detective Senior Sergeant Greg Victor Turner – of Mount Maunganui. For services to the New Zealand Police and the community.
- John James Tutty – of Gore. For services to the New Zealand Fire Service.
- Maevis Elsie Watson – of Rotherham. For services to health and the community.
- Allan Webb – of Te Awamutu. For services to the film industry.
- Graham Allan Wilshier – of Ōtorohanga. For services to the community.
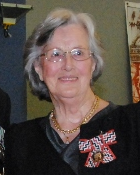
Gretl Bass

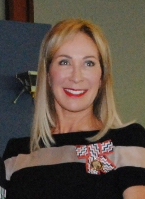
Candy Lane

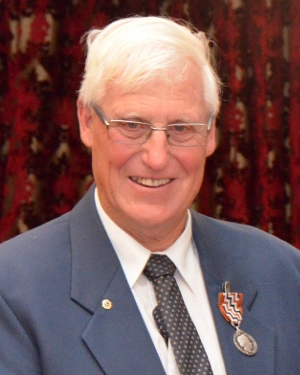
Ray Johnston

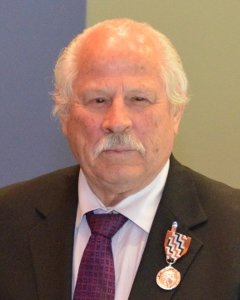
Peter O'Brien

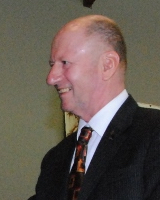
Davorin Ozich

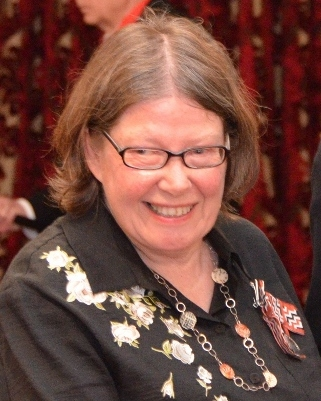
Wendy Pettigrew

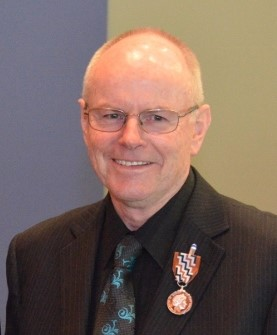
Bill Shepherd

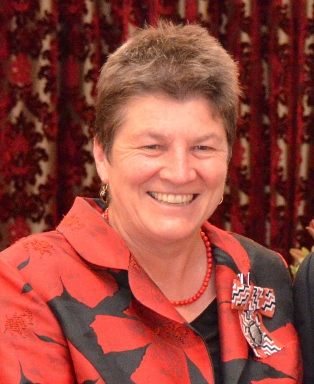
Linda Tame

== New Zealand Distinguished Service Decoration (DSD) ==
- Warrant Officer Class 1 Graeme Alexander Bremner – of Rolleston. For services to the New Zealand Defence Force and brass bands.
- Warrant Officer Class 1 Paul Allister Mumm – of Rolleston. For services to the New Zealand Defence Force.
- Corporal Ewen Vanner – of Palmerston North. For services to the New Zealand Defence Force. (Note: Public announcement of the award to Corporal Vanner was initially withheld for operational reasons, but was published on 3 December 2015 in the New Zealand Gazette.)
