= Margaret Gordon =

Margaret Gordon may refer to:

- Margaret Gordon (illustrator) (1939–1989), British children's book illustrator
- Margaret Gordon (singer) (1880–1962), Welsh singer
- Margaret Harris Gordon, member of the Texas Legislature from 1939 to 1941
- Margaret Gordon (economist), (1910-1994), American economist who worked on employment, social security and welfare, poverty and the economics of higher education
- Lady Margaret Gordon, wife of novelist William Beckford
- Margaret Gordon (actress) in The Flying Scot (film)
- Margaret Gordon, Miss Alabama USA
- Maggie Gordon, character in The Last Starfighter

== See also ==
- Margaret Gordon Burn, New Zealand teacher
- Peggy Gordon, a folk song
