= Sheryl Dawson =

New Zealand netball administrator

Sheryl Dawson MNZM
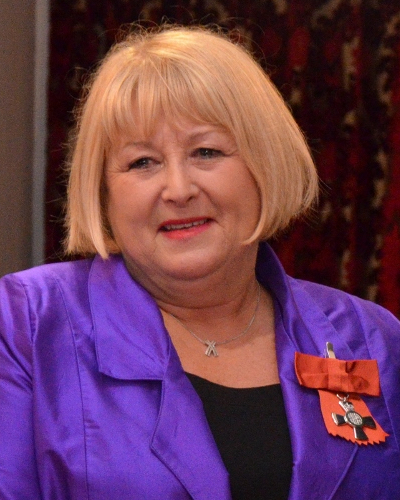
- Dawson in 2014

President of the International Netball Federation
- In office 1999–2003

Personal details
- Born: Sheryl Lorene Lochhead New Zealand
- Occupation: Netball administrator; Schoolteacher; Netball coach

Sheryl Lorene Dawson MNZM (née Lochhead) is a New Zealand netball administrator and coach. She was president of the International Netball Federation from 1999 to 2003.

== Early life ==
Sheryl Lorene Dawson began playing netball at the age of five at the primary school of Te Puna, a small town situated close to Tauranga in the Bay of Plenty region of New Zealand's North Island. At the age of 13 she complained to her parents about the quality of umpiring in the games she played in, and they enrolled her to train as an umpire. At Otumoetai College in Tauranga, Dawson was vice-captain of the netball team in 1966. Having obtained her provincial referee's qualification, she conducted refereeing clinics for other students.

== Netball career ==
Dawson represented Western Bay of Plenty and South Waikato as a player. She then moved on to coach school netball teams from 1975 to 1997, and act as an administrator in the Bay of Plenty region, from 1975 to 1986. In 1987 she returned to Otumoetai College, this time as a member of staff, becoming associate principal before leaving in 1997.

In 1989, Dawson was appointed to the Netball New Zealand board and acted as its delegate to the International Netball Federation from 1990 to 1998, which included a period as chair of the International Rules Rewrite committee. She was in charge of the organizing committee for the 1999 World Netball Championships, which were held in Christchurch, New Zealand. During that event she was appointed as president of the international federation, a position she held for four years.

In 2002 Dawson was appointed to assist with business development for the Waikato Bay of Plenty Magic. She rose to the role of CEO of the Magic, overseeing the team's victory in the 2012 ANZ Championship season. However, in the same year she was not appointed to the CEO position of the newly restructured Netball Waikato Bay of Plenty Zone, for which she had to reapply, a decision of some controversy that led to the resignation of two board members. Dawson then returned to coaching.

== Awards and honours ==
In 1992, Dawson received a New Zealand Netball service award, and in 2003 she was awarded life membership of Netball New Zealand. Dawson was appointed a Member of the New Zealand Order of Merit, for services to netball, in the 2014 New Year Honours. In 2019, she was awarded the International Netball Federation (INF) Service Award, joining fellow New Zealanders Lois Muir, Kereyn Smith, Dawn Jones, Anne Taylor, Marjorie Jenden and Ona Coatsworth who had previously received the same honour.
