= Molly Rhone =

Jamaican athlete

The Honourable Molly May Rhone OJ CD
- Born: Molly May Dacosta; November 1944; Manchester, Colony of Jamaica, British Empire
- Education: Ryerson University
- Occupation: Netball administrator
- Known for: Netball
- Spouse: Izette Rhone
- Children: 2
- Parent(s): Violet and Adolfus Dacosta

Molly May Rhone OJ CD (born November 1944) is a Jamaican sports administrator and former netball player. She served as president of the International Netball Federation (INF) from 2003 to 2019.

== Early life and education ==
Rhone was born in November 1944 in Manchester to parents Violet and Adolfus Dacosta. She attended Knox College, a high school in Spalding, Clarendon, where she started playing netball, and was also active in the school's athletics team. Rhone studied information technology (IT) at the Ryerson Polytechnical Institute in Toronto (Canada), graduating with a diploma in 1969. On her return to Jamaica, she worked as IT director for the national airline Air Jamaica.

== Netball career ==
Rhone played international games as a member of Jamaican Under-21, Under-23 and senior national netball teams, including the 1975 World Netball Tournament, where she was the vice-captain of the Jamaican team. She was elected vice-president of the Jamaica Netball Association in 1991, and was elevated to the office of president in 1993. From 1999 Rhone served concurrently as vice-president of the International Federation of Netball Associations. In 2003 she was elected president of the IFNA, succeeding Sheryl Dawson. To date, she has been the first and only Jamaican woman to head an international sporting body. On July 21, 2019, Rhone stepped down as president of the INF and was succeeded by Liz Nicholl. She was also a member of the Jamaica Anti-Doping Commission (JADCO) and the National Olympic Committee.

== Honours and awards ==
Rhone received her first national honour in 1999 when she was appointed to the Order of Distinction, with the rank of Officer. In 2007, Rhone she was promoted to the rank of Commander for her contribution to local and international sports, in particular Netball. In 2011, she was appointed to the Order of Jamaica, for services locally and internationally in Sports Administration, in particular, Netball.

== Personal life ==
Rhone was married to the late Jamaican golfer Izette Rhone. She has two sons.
