= William Shepherd (disambiguation) =

William Shepherd (born 1949) is an American astronaut, commander of the Expedition One crew on the International Space Station.

William Shepherd may also refer to:

- William Shepherd (British politician) (1910–2002), British Conservative MP, 1945–1966
- William Shepherd (English cricketer) (1840–1919), English cricketer
- William Shepherd (Trinidadian cricketer) (1873–1955), Trinidadian cricketer
- William Robert Shepherd (1871–1934), U.S. cartographer and historian
- William Shepherd (Massachusetts politician) (1837–1907), Massachusetts politician
- Bill Shepherd (American football) (1911–1967), American football player
- Billy Shepherd (basketball) (born 1949), American basketball player
- Bill Shepherd (English footballer) (1920–1983), English footballer for Liverpool F.C.
- Bill Shepherd (politician), chairman of the Northland Regional Council, New Zealand
- William Shepherd (minister) (1768–1847), English dissenting minister and politician
- William James Affleck Shepherd (1866–1946), English illustrator and cartoonist
- Billy Shepherd, pseudonym of Peter Jones (1930–2015), British music journalist
- Billy Shepherd (footballer) (1894–1936), English footballer

== See also ==
- William Sheppard (disambiguation)
- William Shepard (disambiguation)
