= Waitaki Girls' High School =

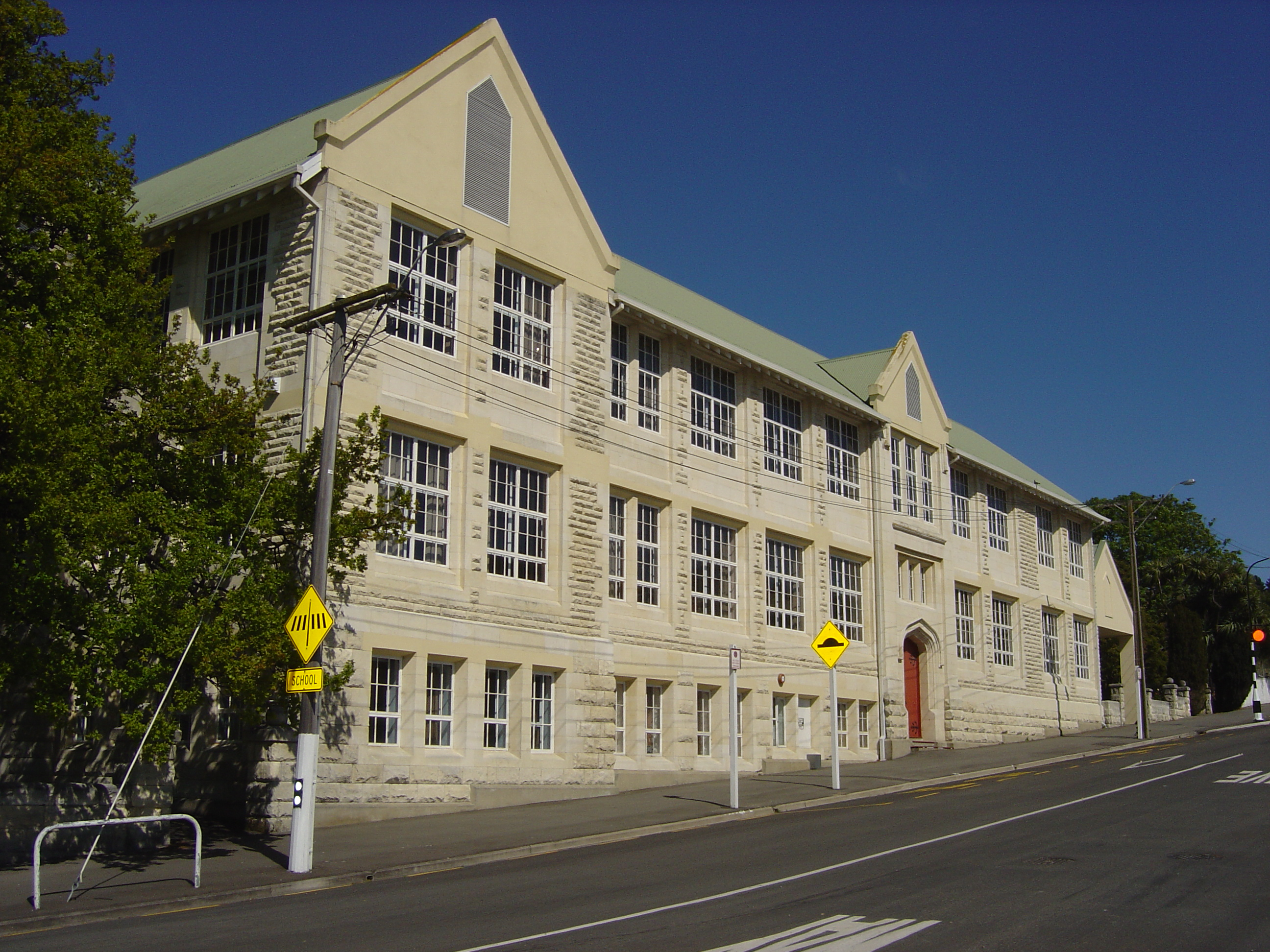
- Junior Block

Location
- Trent Street, Oamaru, New Zealand; 45.0881°S 170.9735°E

Information
- Type: State, Girls, Secondary years 9–13
- Motto: Latin: Dulcius Ex Arduis "Satisfaction from hard work"
- Established: 1887; 139 years ago
- Ministry of Education Institution no.: 366
- Principal: Sarah Hay
- Enrolment: 395 (July 2026)
- Socio-economic decile: 6N
- Website: waitakigirlshigh.school.nz

Waitaki Girls' High School is a state high school for girls situated in Oamaru, on the East coast of New Zealand. It was founded in 1887 on the initiative of local parliamentarians, Samuel Shrimski and Thomas William Hislop, and presently has a roll of just over 400 girls from the ages of 13 to 18. It also has a boarding hostel which houses approximately 50 girls, including international students and tutors.

The school uses a house system with four houses and accompanying colours: Burn (red), Ferguson (yellow), Gibson (green) and Wilson (blue). These houses were named after the first four principals of the school: Margaret Burn, Catherine Ferguson, Mary Gibson and Jessie Wilson. Competitions between the houses, such as athletics, swimming, choir and drama, are held annually.

The school motto is Dulcius Ex Arduis, which in Latin means "satisfaction from hard work".

== Enrolment ==
As of July 2026, the school has roll of 395 students, of which 56 (14.2%) identify as Māori.

As of 2026, the school has an Equity Index of 478, placing it amongst schools whose students have above average socioeconomic barriers to achievement (roughly equivalent to decile 4 under the former socio-economic decile system).

== Curriculum ==
Waitaki Girls' High School uses National Certificate of Educational Achievement (NCEA) based assessments. A strong emphasis is placed on gaining good marks, with "Excellence Awards" being awarded annually to girls who achieve high marks in their internal and external assessments.

Subjects taught include English, mathematics (statistics and calculus), sciences (chemistry, biology, physics, agriculture), languages (Japanese, German, Maori), classics, computer studies, Geography, History, Physical Education and Art (Painting, Photography, Art History).

== Principals ==
Since its establishment in 1887, Waitaki Girls' High School has had 10 principals. The following is a complete list:

	Name	Term
1	Margaret Gordon Burn	1887–1892
2	Catherine Mary Ferguson	1892–1919
3	Jessie Banks Wilson	1920–1949
4	Mary Kathleen Dunning	1950–1963
5	Joyce Jarrold	1963–1979
6	Joyce Mayhew	1979–1986
7	Jeanette Aker	1986–1994
8	Linda Cowan	1994–2007
9	Lynlee Smith	2007–2012
10	Tracey Walker	2012–2019
11	Elizabeth Koni	2019–2022
12	Sarah Hay	2023–present

== Notable alumnae ==
- Anne Taylor – former president of Netball New Zealand and World Netball.
- Isabel Clark – killed in World War I in the sinking of the British troopship SS Marquette
- Janet Frame – New Zealand author
