= Dawn Jones =

Dawn Jones may refer to:

- Dawn Jones (netball) (born 1940), New Zealand netball umpire and administrator, school principal
- Dawn Coe-Jones (1960–2016), Canadian professional golfer
