= Irene McInnes =

New Zealand netball administrator (1893–1969)

Alice Mary Irene McInnes (née Black; 29 April 1893 – 30 August 1969) was a New Zealand sports administrator. She was one of the founders of the New Zealand Basket Ball Association (NZBBA)—the forerunner of Netball New Zealand—in 1924, along with Betty Armstrong and Myrtle Muir, and was the association's first president.

== Biography ==
McInnes was born Alice Mary Irene Black in Victoria, Australia, to Blanche Ann Black (née Ireland) and Robert Black. In her early life, she was known as Rene. She had three siblings: two brothers, one of whom was Gerald Ireland Black; and one sister, Gladys Muriel Black. Following the death of her mother, her father remarried Helen MacKenzie and fathered three more children: Helen MacKenzie Black, Elizabeth Ann Black and Robert Sheriff Black, Irene's half-sisters and brother.

Black studied at Christchurch Teachers' Training College from 1912 to 1914 and passed university courses in mathematics, inorganic chemistry, geology, French and physics as part of her teacher training. Just before the start of World War I, she qualified as a science teacher. She worked during the war at Waitati Primary School in Blueskin Bay, and later at Columba College in Dunedin as the mathematics and science mistress. During this time she was an active member of the YWCA.

In 1919, Black married Ralph Saxelby McInnes in Dunedin, and they had three daughters: Edith Irene, Blanche Alice and Alison Mary; and one son, Paul Black McInnes.

McInnes was the first president of the NZBBA in 1924, and was also its first life member. She strongly believed netball was critical for the health and wellbeing of girls, particularly as women's roles began to change after the war. She had a deep commitment to girls' wellbeing and wanted to create opportunities and improve the quality of life of women. She was also interested in standardising rules in New Zealand and served as a referee and as vice-president of the Referees' Association.

McInnes was succeeded by Myrtle Muir as president of the New Zealand Basketball Association (so renamed in 1926) in 1932. In 1938, McInnes was named one of 12 inaugural members of the National Council of Physical Welfare and Recreation, the forerunner of Sport New Zealand. She was also active in the girl guide movement, and between 1935 and 1949 served as commissioner for the Lone Guides Movement New Zealand. She became involved in the Gold Star Mothers' Club after her son was killed during the Battle of Monte Cassino in 1944, and was also a member of the National Council of Women and the Plunket Society.

McInnes lived in the Wellington suburb of Hataitai, overlooking the netball courts. She died on 30 August 1969, at the age of 76, two months before her husband.

On 18 October 2026, McInnes was posthumously inducted into the Netball New Zealand Hall of Fame.
