= Scenic Hotel Group =

New Zealand hotel operator

Scenic Hotel Group Limited
- Formerly: Scenic Circle Hotels (1982–2009)
- Company type: Private
- Industry: Hospitality
- Founded: 1982; 44 years ago, in Dunedin, New Zealand.
- Founder: Earl Hagaman and Ralph Brown
- Headquarters: Christchurch, New Zealand
- Number of locations: 18 (2026)
- Area served: New Zealand
- Key people: Karl Luxon (CEO)
- Products: Hotels; Resorts
- Brands: Scenic Circle; Heartland; Legacy Collection
- Website: www.scenichotelgroup.co.nz

Scenic Hotel Group is a New Zealand hotelier that operates the Heartland and Scenic Circle hotel brands across New Zealand and the Pacific Islands.

== History ==
The hotel brand was founded in the 1980s by Earl Hagaman and Ralph Brown after they moved to New Zealand. Initially they began with property and accommodation ventures in Queenstown, but began Scenic Circle with the purchase of a Franz Josef hotel in 1980, followed by the Southern Cross Hotel in Dunedin in November 1984. By 1986 the Scenic Circle Corporation had grown enough to seek a listing on the stock exchange. The following year they purchased a hotel property in Queenstown. In 1988 the business struggled due to a downturn in the tourism sector and was forced to sell the recently acquired Queenstown property, but returned to profit by 1990.

While initially based in Dunedin, the business expanded across the South Island, purchasing hotels in tourism centres Franz Josef / Waiau and Fox Glacier. In 1990 the group expanded operations in Franz Josef by purchasing the THC Hotel. In 1991 they expanded to Christchurch with the purchase of the Cotswold Inn. The Cotswold was styled as an old Tudor inn, though it was originally built in the 1980s. Also in 1991 Scenic Circle began managing the A-Line Hotel in Queenstown; the hotel had been founded by Brown in the 1970s, but had been sold and ultimately ended up in Singaporean ownership. The group purchased the property outright in 1995. With the purchase, Scenic Circle controlled hotel operations in all of the major tourism centres of the South Island. Hagaman declared an intention to expand to the North Island. Brown and Hagaman bought back shares and took the business private again in 1991.

Brown died unexpectedly of a heart attack shortly after completing a marathon in Canada in 1995. Brown was replaced by Brendan Taylor in the managing director role.

In 2009 Scenic Circle Hotels restructured into the Scenic Hotel Group. As part of the restructure it divided its hotels into two brands: Heartland was aimed at the more affordable 3-star market segment, and Scenic Circle was aimed at the 4-star and above segment. The group also opened the 5-star Te Waonui Forest Retreat in Franz Josef.

In 2014, Scenic took over operation of the Matavai Resort in Niue. The contract was awarded by a trust, whose trustees were appointed by Foreign Affairs Minister Murray McCully. The contract was awarded after a NZ$100,000 donation by Earl Hagaman to the New Zealand National Party, and the following year the National government announced NZ$7,500,000 in aid funding would be redirected to expansion of the resort. Opposition leader Andrew Little complained to the Auditor-General over the decision, though McCully denied that there was any connection between the donation and the contract being awarded. The Hagaman's subsequently sued Little for NZ$2,300,000 for defamation, and Little apologised to them after the Auditor-General found no evidence of corruption. The Hagaman's eventually lost the defamation case.

In 2016, a flash flood of the Waiho River in Franz Josef flooded the 1960s-era Scenic Circle Hotel complex just north of the township. Prior to the flooding, the hotel group was one of several local businesses that declined to contribute to a council plan to build flood protection stopbanks along the river. The hotel's insurers sued the local council for NZ$30,000,000, claiming that the council had performed work on a stopbank that failed during the flood, worsening the impact on the hotel; the dispute was settled in 2023. Construction of a replacement stopbank to prevent future flooding was also delayed by disagreements between the council and the hotel group. In 2023, Scenic Group said they were committed to a NZ$50,000,000 rebuild of the complex; as of 2026 the facility remains abandoned.

The COVID-19 pandemic and related border closures had a major impact on the business. In 2021, Scenic announced they would be temporarily closing their West Coast hotels, a move which was welcomed by the Westland District mayor Bruce Smith. In late 2022 the group purchased a hotel property at Punakaiki, north of Greymouth.
