= Kereyn Smith =

New Zealand sports administrator

Kereyn Smith CNZM
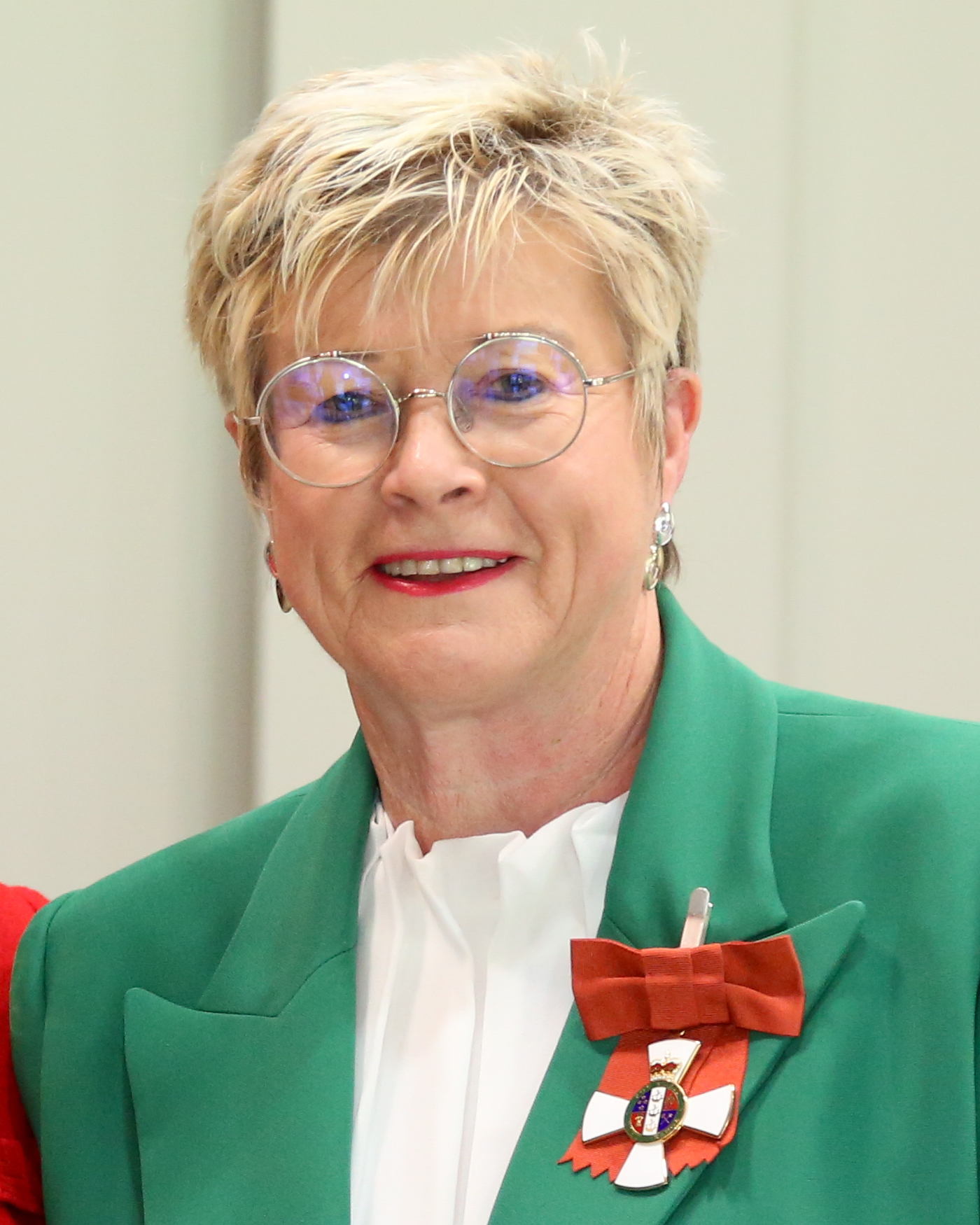

CEO and Secretary General of New Zealand Olympic Committee (NZOC)
- In office 2011–2021
- Preceded by: Barry Maister
- Succeeded by: Nicki Nicol

Personal details
- Born: Kereyn Maree Smith; 7 November 1960 (age 65) Clinton, New Zealand
- Education: University of Otago, University of Canterbury

Kereyn Maree Smith CNZM (born 7 November 1960) is a New Zealand sports administrator. She was the chief executive and secretary general of the New Zealand Olympic Committee (NZOC) from January 2011 to December 2021. She has also held several other roles in sports administration.

== Early life ==
Smith was born in Clinton in the South Otago region of the South Island of New Zealand. Growing up on a farm, she attended Clinton primary school and South Otago High School. Part of a rugby-playing family, she was active in sport. However, her plans to compete at the highest levels ended when, while still at school, she was thrown from a horse, breaking her leg and damaging her knee. After leaving school she obtained a diploma in physical education from the University of Otago, graduating in 1981, and followed this with a diploma in teaching from Christchurch Teachers College, now part of the University of Canterbury, where she played both netball and rugby.

== Career ==
After obtaining teaching qualifications, Smith taught physical education in New Zealand and in the United Kingdom. She then took up a management position in Sport Manawatū. At the same time, she was carrying out coaching and administrative roles on a voluntary basis, mainly in netball, leading to her being appointed to the board of Netball New Zealand, which she chaired for six of the eleven years she was on it. She was also vice-chair of the International Netball Federation. In other sporting roles she became a trustee for the multipurpose Forsyth Barr Stadium in Dunedin and a director of the Highlanders rugby union team in Dunedin. In 2004, she returned to her alma mater of the University of Otago as a Council member, staying in that role for a decade.

Smith served as private secretary to New Zealand's Minister of Sport, Fitness and Leisure. She then became senior manager and then general manager of the Hillary Commission, named after Sir Edmund Hillary who, together with Tenzing Norgay, was the first person to climb Mount Everest. The Commission was later renamed Sport New Zealand. In 2000 she was appointed chief executive of the New Zealand Academy of Sport (South Island), holding that position until the South Island Academy was merged with that of the North Island to form High Performance Sport NZ, a section of Sport New Zealand.

== New Zealand Olympic Committee ==
At the end of 2010 Smith was appointed Secretary General of the New Zealand Olympic Committee (NZOC), the first woman to be given this role. She announced her retirement in 2021 and in December 2021 it was announced that Nicki Nicol had been chosen to replace her. One of her main aims during her tenure had been to increase the number of women involved in leadership positions in sport. For these efforts the NZOC was awarded the International Olympic Committee's World Trophy for Women in Sport in November 2015, the first time the award had been given to any national Olympic committee. The NZOC's activities that led to the award included the Aspiring Women's Olympic Leaders programme, which supports female athletes to transition to leadership positions in the work place. The NZOC also monitors the gender balance on national sports boards.

Smith was responsible for organising the participation of more than one thousand athletes from New Zealand, together with their support teams, at three Summer Olympic Games (London 2012, Rio de Janeiro 2016, Tokyo 2021), two Winter Olympic Games (Sochi 2014, PyeongChang 2018) and two Commonwealth Games (Glasgow 2014, Queensland 2018). Her role included logistics and well as generating sponsorship. Particular difficulties were experienced as a result of the postponement of the 2020 Tokyo Olympics as a result of the COVID-19 pandemic. In addition to her role with NZOC, Smith was involved with the International Olympic Committee (IOC), including as a member of the 2024 Olympic Bid Evaluation Commission. She is also vice-president of the Commonwealth Games Federation board.

== Awards and honours ==
Smith was given the IOC Women in Sport award in 1999. She received the Netball New Zealand service award in 2006. In 2012 she was inducted into the Wall of Fame of her alma mater, the University of Otago and in the same year she was made a life member of Netball New Zealand. In 2015 she was made a Member of the New Zealand Order of Merit (MNZM) in the Queen's Birthday Honours. Smith received the International Netball Federation service award in 2017. In the 2023 New Year Honours, Smith was promoted to Companion of the New Zealand Order of Merit, for services to sports governance.

In 2024, Smith was an inaugural inductee to the Netball New Zealand Hall of Fame.
