= Cindy Farquhar =

Physician

Cindy Farquhar CNZM
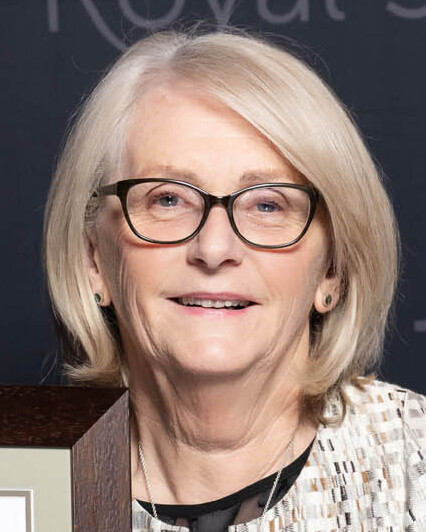
- Farquhar in 2024
- Born: Cynthia Margaret Farquhar; 12 August 1956 (age 70); Auckland, New Zealand
- Education: University of Auckland
- Occupations: Professor, researcher, fertility doctor
- Known for: Research in women’s reproductive and sexual health

Cynthia Margaret Farquhar CNZM (born 12 August 1956) is the Postgraduate Professor of Obstetrics and Gynaecology in the Department of Obstetrics and Gynaecology at the University of Auckland. Within the Cochrane Collaboration, she is the Co-ordinating Editor of Cochrane Gynaecology and Fertility. Farquhar has over 200 published papers, with a focus on women's reproductive and sexual health.

== Education ==
Farquhar completed a Bachelor of Human Biology (UA) in 1979 and a Bachelor of Medicine/Bachelor of Surgery at the University of Auckland in 1982. The following year she completed a Postgraduate Diploma of Obstetrics and Medical Gynaecology (UA), and Part 1 Member at the Royal College of Obstetricians and Gynaecologists. In 1986 Farquhar completed Part 2 Member Royal College of Obstetricians and Gynaecologists. In 1991 she became a Fellow of the Royal New Zealand College of Obstetricians & Gynaecologists and completed her doctoral thesis on the management of chronic pelvic pain in women. In 1998 Farquhar became a Fellow of the Royal Australian and New Zealand College of Obstetricians and Gynaecologists when they amalgamated. In 1992 she completed Doctor of Medicine (UA), followed in 1998 by a Certificate in Reproductive Endocrinology & Infertility (Sub-specialization) at the Royal Australian and New Zealand College of Obstetrics & Gynaecology. In 2003 Farquhar became a Fellow of the Royal College of Obstetricians and Gynaecologists and gained a Masters in Public Health (1st UA).

== Cochrane ==
Farquhar is the Co-ordinating Editor of Cochrane Gynaecology and Fertility, which she established in 1996 and is one of 52 Review Groups of Cochrane. The aim of the group is to produce high quality systematic reviews of menstrual disorders and subfertility, including premenstrual syndrome, menorrhagia, menopause, cycling disorders and pelvic pain, which are published on the Cochrane Library. The group is funded by the New Zealand Ministry of Health as well as external funding grant organisations.

Her roles within Cochrane have been extensive and include being a member of the steering group (the governance body for Cochrane) from 1996 to 1998, of which she was the co-chair; she has been a member of the Cochrane Library Oversight Committee from 2010 to 2013; chair of the Funding Arbitration Committee since 2013; and was a member of the Co-ordinating Editors Executive since 2005.

Farquhar is also the co-director of the New Zealand Cochrane Branch of the Australasian Cochrane Centre, which promotes the use of the Cochrane Library and provides training to New Zealand review authors. The Branch successfully negotiated a national licence in 2006 and in 2013 New Zealand had the highest number of Cochrane first authors per head of population in the world.

In addition to this, Farquhar is the mentoring Co-ordinating Editor of Cochrane Sexually Transmitted Infections (STI) at the National University of Colombia in Bogota, Colombia. This review group is the first one in Cochrane to be based in a low- or middle-income country and has been successful in capacity building.

As of September 2018, Farquhar is the Senior Editor of the Cochrane Long Term Conditions and Ageing 1 Network.

== Perinatal and maternal mortality ==
The Perinatal and Maternal Mortality Review Committee (PMMRC) was established in 2005. Farquhar was the inaugural chairperson until 2013 and was involved in establishing the processes for national data collection across 21 district health boards for all perinatal and maternal deaths. Groups which report to the PMMRC include the Maternal Mortality Working Group, the Neonatal Encephalopathy Working Group and the Australasian Maternity Outcomes Surveillance Survey (AMOSS) Working Group who working jointly to collect morbidity data.

Farquhar holds the contract for the national co-ordinator services for the PMMRC to collect data and produce annual reports. Prior to the establishment of this database New Zealand did not report reliable maternal or perinatal mortality data, but now have data from 2006 to 2013. The impact of the PMMRC and related databases has led to new funding recommendations by the Ministry of Health.

== Clinical work and clinical studies ==
From 2001 to 2004 Farquhar was the Clinical Director of Gynaecology at National Women's Hospital, in Auckland. She also works for Fertility Plus and in the Gynaecology Department of National Women's Health in Auckland and her sub-specialty interests include chronic pelvic pain, endometriosis, gynaecological endocrinology and infertility, menopause, heavy menstrual bleeding, management of polycystic ovarian syndrome and laparoscopic surgery.

== Medical history research ==
In 2025 Farquhar and historian Michaela Selway published a book Against the Odds: New Zealand's first women doctors, covering the biographies and history of 150 women medical graduates over the period from the 1890s to 1967. The biographies finish in 1967 because this marks the establishment of the Auckland Medical School, and from that point on the numbers of women graduates increased significantly. Farquhar was prompted to begin working on medical history when she noticed a difference in how her mother and father, both doctors, were treated after their deaths. When her father died, The New Zealand Medical Journal asked Farquhar to write a 300 word obituary, which they published. Three years later, on the death of her mother, no such request was forthcoming (although Farquhar wrote and submitted an obituary anyway). After this, Farquhar established a website publishing biographies of early New Zealand medical graduates, which formed the basis of the book, published by Massey University Press in 2025.

== Awards and honours ==
- 1979 – Wallath Prize (for the best Medical Research Council Summer Studentship project)
- 1981 – W W Phillips Scholarship (travel)
- 1990 – Roger Wurm Medal for best research project, Australian Society for Psychosomatics in Obstetrics & Gynaecology
- 1994 – The Fertility Society of Australia Organising Committee prize for the best Mini Poster encouraging the Development of Scientific Research
- 1994 – The Wilton Henley Travelling Fellowship for 6 months study leave
- 1999 – Harkness Fellowship in Health Policy of the Commonwealth Fund of New York 2000: Agency for Healthcare Research and Quality, Washington DC, USA.
- 2001 – Townsend Travelling Professor to The Royal Women's Hospital, Melbourne, Australia
- 2002 – Prize for Outstanding Paper at the combined RCOG/RANZCOG Annual Scientific Meeting, Sydney
- 2003 – Prize for Best Free Communication at the Australian Gynaecology Endoscopic Surgery Annual Meeting, Melbourne, Australia.
- 2006 – Appointed a Member of the New Zealand Order of Merit in the 2006 Queen's Birthday Honours, for services to women's health
- 2011 – Awarded Jim Petrie Travelling Professorship in Evidence Based Medicine, University of Aberdeen
- 2013 – Anne BM Anderson award from the Cochrane Collaboration for “promotion of women as leaders and contributors to the Cochrane leadership”. 21st Cochrane Colloquium, Quebec City, Canada.
- 2014 – Appointed a Companion of the New Zealand Order of Merit in the 2014 New Year Honours, for services to women's health
- Excellence in Research Award Auckland District Health Board awarded to Michelle Wise, S Lensen, J Thompson. “The Role of Body Mass Index and Endometrial Hyperplasia and Cancer Study”
- 2017 – Aldo Vacca Medal of the Royal Australian and New Zealand College of Obstetrics and Gynaecology awarded to Professor C. Farquhar for the Best Oral Presentation at the Annual Scientific Meeting
- 2018 – Liley Medal of the Health Research Medal presented at Aotearoa New Zealand Research Awards
- 2018 – Excellence in Research Award Auckland District Health Board
- 2019 – Elected a Fellow of the Royal Society of New Zealand
- 2019 – Research Excellence Medal, University of Auckland
- 2019 – Excellence in Research Award Auckland District Health Board
- 2023 – Peter Gluckman Medal for Distinguished Contribution to Research at the Faculty of Medical and Health Sciences, The University of Auckland.
- 2024 – Beavan Medal for excellence in translational health research, Health Research Council New Zealand
