= William Shepard (disambiguation) =

William Shepard was a Massachusetts soldier and legislator.

William Shepard may also refer to:

- William Biddle Shepard, North Carolina legislator

== See also ==
- William Shepard Wetmore, American businessman and philanthropist
- William Sheppard (disambiguation)
- William Shepherd (disambiguation)
