= Earl Hagaman =

American-born New Zealand hotel operator

Earl Hagaman CNZM
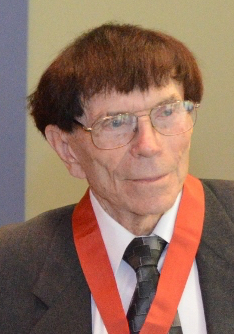
- Hagaman in 2014
- Born: Earl Raymond Hagaman; 12 September 1925; Los Angeles, California, US
- Died: 25 May 2017 (aged 91); Christchurch, New Zealand
- Occupation: Hotel operator

Earl Raymond Hagaman CNZM (12 September 1925 – 25 May 2017) was an American-born New Zealand hotel operator.

== Biography ==
Hagaman was born in Los Angeles on 12 September 1925. From 1961 to March 1981, he was married to Barbara Jean Fairbank. He moved to New Zealand in 1983 after visiting his friend Ralph Brown, who had moved to New Zealand in 1972. Brown and Hagaman invested in hotels and out of this venture, Scenic Hotel Group developed. At the time of his death, Hagaman's hotel empire employed around 1000 staff. In 1989, Hagaman bought the house of Sir Robertson Stewart in the Christchurch suburb of Ilam, and lived there for the rest of his life. The house had a 2007 rating valuation of just under NZ$4m.

In the 2014 New Year Honours, Hagaman was appointed a Companion of the New Zealand Order of Merit for services to business, tourism and philanthropy.

Hagaman was in his 60s when he hired a financial controller for Scenic Group; she was in her early 20s. Hagaman's fourth marriage was failing and he later married his employee – Lani Hagaman. They had three children together, and Hagaman had four children from prior relationships. Earl and Lani Hagaman's wealth was estimated by the National Business Review at NZ$180m.

The Hagamans were large donors to various causes, including St. Andrew's College (NZ$250k), ChristChurch Cathedral, the National Party, and the ACT Party. The Hagamans have donated more than NZ$10m. The Hagamans sued Labour Party leader Andrew Little for defamation and sought $2.3m in damages. Whilst Little was found guilty of defaming Earl Hagaman on one count, the jury could not decide on all other claims, and the High Court judge thus let all claims retire. Shortly after the verdict in April 2017, Lani Hagaman declared that she would seek a retrial. Lani Hagaman laid an appeal in September 2017, after her husband had died. She must overcome the legal hurdle that according to the Law Reform Act 1936, a defamation case cannot continue after a person's death. Her lawyers argue that the case had already been heard, and they want to test whether the trial judge advised the jury correctly on the point of qualified privilege that members of parliament enjoy speaking inside Parliament.

In 2010, property claims by his former wife Fairbanks appeared in the Christchurch High Court after having previously been filed in a Californian superior court. The Christchurch court was tasked by the Californian court to take evidence from eight witnesses including Hagaman himself. Six of the witnesses refused and the case went to the Court of Appeal of New Zealand, which upheld the request. Hagaman died at his home on 25 May 2017. He was survived by his wife, their children, and the four children from previous relationships. In Hagaman's will, NZ$1.5m is set aside for some of his children that can only be distributed once Hagaman's trustees consider that all claims by Fairbank have been settled.
