= William Sheppard =

William Sheppard may refer to:

- Bill Sheppard (footballer) (1906–1950), English association footballer.
- Bill Sheppard (music producer), American R&B producer of the 1950s and 60s
- William Sheppard (barrister) (died 1674), English legal writer
- William Sheppard (painter) (fl. 1660s), English painter
- William Sheppard (trainer) (1855–1932), racehorse trainer in South Australia
- William Sheppard (baseball), American baseball player
- William Fleetwood Sheppard, Australian-British mathematician and statistician
- William Henry Sheppard, African-American Presbyterian missionary famous for revealing Belgian atrocities in the Congo Free State
- W. Morgan Sheppard (1932–2019), William Morgan Sheppard, British actor, sometimes credited as Morgan Sheppard
- William Bostwick Sheppard (1860–1934), U.S. federal judge

== See also ==
- William Shepard (disambiguation)
- William Shepherd (disambiguation)
