= Anne Taylor (netball administrator) =

New Zealand netball umpire and administrator (born 1936)

Anne Taylor OBE

President of Netball New Zealand
- In office 1978–1987
- Preceded by: Joyce McCann
- Succeeded by: Dawn Jones

President of the International Federation of Netball Associations
- In office 1995–1999
- Preceded by: Pat Taylor

Personal details
- Born: Evelyn Anne Scott; 4 July 1936 (age 90) Balclutha, New Zealand
- Spouse: Douglas Maurice Taylor (m. 1960)
- Children: 3
- Education: University of Otago
- Occupation: Netball administrator; netball coach

Evelyn Anne Taylor OBE (née Scott; born 4 July 1936) is a former New Zealand netball administrator, coach and umpire. From 1978 to 1987, she was president of Netball New Zealand and between 1989 and 1999 she was vice-president and president of the International Netball Federation.

== Early life and family ==
Taylor was born Evelyn Anne Scott in Balclutha on 4 July 1936. She was educated at Waitaki Girls' High School in Oamaru, and went on to study at the University of Otago, where she earned a Diploma in Physical Education in 1958. While at Otago, Scott captained the university netball club and was on the university sports council. After graduating, she taught physical education at Hamilton Girls' High School, and volunteered as a fitness class instructor at Hamilton YWCA.

In 1960, Scott married Douglas Maurice Taylor, and the couple went on to have three children.

== Netball administration ==
Taylor became a certified netball coach and umpire. She was an umpire for the first televised netball test match in New Zealand in 1969. In 1978, she was appointed president of Netball New Zealand, a position she held until 1987. During her tenure the association significantly raised the profile of netball in New Zealand, attracting both media coverage and commercial sponsorship. In part, she achieved this by arranging test matches in the March–April period, at a time when other sport on television was limited, even though that meant scheduling international matches during the domestic netball season, which had not been done before. Taylor was responsible for starting a league for club teams, sponsored by the Bendon Group, a lingerie company, and for obtaining sponsorship from Nestlé under the Milo brand for test matches against teams from overseas. Her decision to move Netball New Zealand's headquarters to Auckland from the capital, Wellington, facilitated access to sponsors, and she also hired a marketing company. Attracting sponsors was helped by the success of the Silver Ferns, the New Zealand national netball team, who won the 1987 World Netball Tournament.

In 1985, while still with Netball New Zealand, Taylor also became the executive officer of the Oceania Netball Federation, a position she held until 1995. She was appointed vice-president of the International Federation of Netball Associations, now called World Netball, in 1989 and subsequently became president, serving until 1999. Other positions that she has held have included membership of the New Zealand Council for Recreation and Sport, the Hillary Commission, now known as Sport New Zealand, and the New Zealand Sports Drug Agency. She also chaired Bowls Waikato.

== Awards and honours ==
Taylor was made a life member of Netball New Zealand in 1987 and in the same year received a Halberg Award for her services to sport. In the 1988 Queen's Birthday Honours, she was appointed an Officer of the Order of the British Empire, for services to netball. In 2000, in celebration of the 75th anniversary of netball in New Zealand, she was awarded Netball New Zealand's lifetime contribution award. In 2012, she was inducted into the Wall of Fame of the School of Physical Education at the University of Otago.

In 2024, Taylor was an inaugural inductee to the Netball New Zealand Hall of Fame, and was one of three inductees elevated to Icon status.
