= Netball New Zealand Hall of Fame =

- Awarded for: Individuals who have made a significant contribution to netball in New Zealand as administrators, umpires, coaches or players
- Country: New Zealand
- First award: 24 February 2024
- Latest award: 18 October 2026

Highlights
- Total: 17
- Website: netballnz.co.nz/netball-nz/our-game/awards/netball-nz-hall-of-fame.html

The Netball New Zealand Hall of Fame is a figurative hall of fame dedicated to New Zealanders who have been influential in netball and have dedicated their lives to the betterment of the game. Inductees may come from all areas of netball, and may include players, umpires, coaches, administrators and support staff. The hall was established in 2024 by Netball New Zealand (NNZ) to mark the centenary of the organisation, and the first inductions were announced at the 97th annual general meeting of NNZ in Auckland on 24 February 2024. Five further inductees were announced on 18 October 2026.

== Laureates ==
The following is a complete list of laureates of the Netball New Zealand Hall of Fame. Selected inductees are accorded "icon status".

Year	Laureate	Notes
2024	Ruth Aitken	
2024	Judy Blair	
2024	Sandra Edge	
2024	Joan Harnett	
2024	Taini Jamison	
2024	Dawn Jones	Icon status
2024	Casey Kopua	
2024	Laura Langman	
2024	Lois Muir	Icon status
2024	Kereyn Smith	
2024	Anne Taylor	Icon status
2024	Irene van Dyk	
2026	Leigh Gibbs	
2026	Irene McInnes	
2026	Myrtle Muir	
2026	Waimarama Taumaunu	
2026	Yvonne Willering	
