= Wenceslaus Anthony =

Indian-born New Zealand businessman (1957–2017)

Wenceslaus Anthony MNZM
- Born: 28 September 1957; Burma
- Died: 23 July 2017 (aged 59); Chennai, India
- Education: Loyola College, Chennai
- Occupations: Businessman; educationist
- Office: Chairman/managing director, WA Marketing Ltd; Chairman/director, Pact Industries Pty Ltd
- Spouse: Susan
- Children: 2
- Awards: Pro Ecclesia et Pontifice Member of the New Zealand Order of Merit

Vailankanni Wenceslaus Melchoir Anthony MNZM (28 September 1957 – 23 July 2017) was an Indian-origin New Zealand businessman. He was a recipient of the title, Member of the New Zealand Order of Merit and the Pro Ecclesia et Pontifice.

== Early years & Career in India ==
Anthony was born on 28 September 1957 in Myanmar, to an Indian family. He graduated with a B.Com (Hons) from St Xavier's college Kolkata, then an M.B.A. from Loyola College, Chennai. He was married to Susan and the couple had two children, Sneha and Akash (died July 2020).

Anthony started his career at Godrej and Boyce and subsequently moved to Hindustan Computers Ltd. Later, he became the Deputy Director and Secretary to the Board of Studies for Loyola Institute of Business Administration in the well known Loyola College, Chennai, India.

== Career and other appointments in New Zealand ==
Anthony migrated to New Zealand in 1999 and established WAML Group with offices in New Zealand, Australia, India, Sri Lanka, Singapore and other countries. In 2001 Anthony was member of New Zealand Ministerial Delegation to India with Paul Swain, Minister of Information Technology. He was also an important member of the Official Delegation of New Zealand Prime Minister John Key during his state visit to India in June 2011, where he attended a State Banquet with then Indian Prime Minister Manmohan Singh and was also part of Prime Minister John Key's delegation to Sri Lanka in Feb 2016. In June 2012, Anthony was appointed as a Director on the Board of Bank of Baroda in New Zealand.

Anthony was passionate about education and was also the Chairperson of Business Advisory Group of International College of Auckland The college has instituted a student scholarship in his name. He was the first person of Indian origin to be appointed Chair of the India New Zealand Business Council -INZBC that looks after Trade and Business between India and New Zealand and completed his term in June 2013. He was the head of Government Relations in INZBC. He continued to be actively involved in India New Zealand trade relations. He was a special guest at the fourth anniversary of the New Zealand branch of the Global Organisation of People of Indian Origin (GOPIO) held at Alexandra Park in Greenlane, Auckland on Saturday, 27 October 2012 . The Hon'ble Speaker of India Parliament, on her official visit to New Zealand, presented a memento to Anthony in appreciation of his contribution to the community.

Anthony was also on the Advisory Board of New Zealand India Research Institute, Victoria University of Wellington and on the board of directors for various companies in Auckland.

In 2014 he was appointed the chairman of the Multicultural New Zealand Business Advisory Board to provide support and advocacy for small and medium businesses.

== Faith and other community activities ==
Anthony was a practising Catholic and was involved in many church and community activities. He was appointed to the board of the Catholic Caring Foundation by the Most Reverend Patrick Dunn (bishop) Bishop of Auckland. Having known and worked closely with the late Mother Teresa he was the chairman of the Mother Teresa Interfaith Committee, which organises yearly gatherings on Mother's birthday between people of different faiths and religious leaders to honour her work of reaching out to all people irrespective of religion and background. He was also in charge of the New Zealand branch of Divine Retreat Centre, Muringoor. He was the founder Director of Conquest Club in New Zealand which aims to form young men to grow in character and virtue to be future leaders in their community and was also a member of various other church and community organisations.

== Honours ==
Ribbon of the New Zealand Order of Merit

In the 2014 New Year Honours, Anthony was appointed a Member of the New Zealand Order of Merit, for services to New Zealand–India relations. Functions to honour his achievement by the various communities he served in were held across Auckland and in India. In 2017, he received the Pro Ecclesia et Pontifice decoration of the Roman Catholic Church. Wenceslaus Anthony Commemoration Award is an annual award, instituted in honor of Anthony, to recognize excellence in business and accounting & taxation.

== Death ==
Anthony died on 23 July 2017 at Apollo Hospital, Chennai, due to multiple organ failure. His death was mourned by numerous friends and associates all over the world including condolences from Members of Parliament, former Prime Ministers of New Zealand Sir John Key, Sir Bill English, Former Governor General Sir Anand Satyananad, Former Sri Lankan Prime Minister Mr Ranil Wickremesinghe, Bishop of Auckland Patrick Dunn, Archbishop of Chennai George Antonysamy, Cardinal Oswald Gracias of Mumbai and many other business and religious leaders.

== Positions held ==
Position	Institution
Chairman & Managing Director	WAML Group
Chairman & Director	Pact Industries Pty Ltd
Chairman	India New Zealand Business Council-INZBC
Head	Government Relations-INZBC
Director	Bank of Baroda NZ
Advisory board member	New Zealand India Research Institute, Victoria University of Wellington
Chairperson	Multicultural NZ Business Advisory Board
Chairperson	Business Advisory Group, International College of Auckland
Director	Swansky Limited
