= Liz Nicholl =

Welsh sports administrator and former netball player (born 1952)

Dame Elizabeth Mary Nicholl DBE (née Daley; born August 1952) is a Welsh sports administrator and former netball player. She was chief executive of UK Sport from 2010 to 2019, and is the president of World Netball, having been re-elected for a second term of four years in 2023, and chair of the World Netball Foundation, launched in 2023.

== Early life and education ==
Nicholl was born in Barry, Vale of Glamorgan, Wales, the sixth of seven children. Her father was a junior schoolteacher and coached his school's football and cricket teams. She played various sports growing up and tried to compete with the boys on her father's teams. She began playing netball competitively and played at university. One of her coaches at university was Sue Campbell, now Baroness Campbell, who also was Chair of UK Sport. Nicholl represented Wales in international netball competition including two world championships, with 22 caps between 1975 and 1979. She played as a centre and wing attack.

Nicholl earned a Bachelor of Science degree in chemistry from the University of Nottingham, a Post Graduate Certificate in Education from Leicester University and a Master's of Science in Recreation Management at Loughborough University.

== Career ==
Nicholl was chief executive of the All England Netball Association from 1980 to 1982 and 1986 to 1999, and was director of the 1995 World Netball Championships held in Birmingham. Nicholl joined UK Sport in 1999 as the Director of Elite Sport overseeing the Performance Directorate. After 10 years in this role, she was appointed chief operating officer (COO) in 2009. In 2010, she was named chief executive officer.

During her time at UK Sport, the United Kingdom has improved significantly in international sporting events. The UK finished just 36th in the medal table at the 1996 Summer Olympics in Atlanta, but improved its performance at each successive Olympic Games. In 2016, the UK finished second in the Olympic and Paralympics medal tables and made history as the first country to increase its medal count at both the Olympics and the Paralympics immediately after hosting the Games. Nicholl has been called the architect of the organisation's strict "all or nothing" funding system, which has faced criticism due to its focus on medal count and budget cuts in sports that perform poorly. In 2014 she was called "the most powerful woman" in British sport.

Nicholl left her role as CEO at UK Sport in July 2019.

== Voluntary roles ==
Nicholl is currently the President of World Netball. She was elected at the INF Congress 2019 in Liverpool ahead of the 2019 Netball World Cup.

In 2019, she was appointed to the FAs Barclays Womens Super League Board, and will step down in 2024.

Previous voluntary roles include being a member of H M Government Sports Honours Committee 2017-2023; Vice Chair of Commonwealth Games England and Board member of Manchester 2002 Commonwealth Games 1998-2003; Board member of the Central Council of Physical Recreation (now rebranded Sport and Recreation Alliance) and its Vice Chair 1997-99. Nicholl stepped down from these two roles at the appropriate points to avoid any potential conflict of interest with her UK Sport role.

== Honours ==
Nicholl was appointed Member of the Order of the British Empire (MBE) in the 2000 New Year Honours for services to netball, Officer of the Order of the British Empire (OBE) in the 2006 Birthday Honours, Commander of the Order of the British Empire (CBE) in the 2015 Birthday Honours, and Dame Commander of the Order of the British Empire (DBE) in the 2023 Birthday Honours, all for services to sport.

Nicholl received honorary doctorates from the University of Hertfordshire 2015; the University of Nottingham in 2015 and the University of Loughborough in 2019

In 1996, she received the Sunday Times Sports Administrator of the Year Award.

In 2016, Nicholl was awarded the Sports Journalists' Association (SJA) Gold Medal for services to elite sport.

In 2019, she received the British Sport Industry Lifetime Achievement Award.

== Personal life ==
She married Andrew Nicholl in 1980. They have two adult children and two granddaughters. She and her husband, a retired sports management consultant, live in Hitchin, Hertfordshire.
