= Billy Shepherd (footballer) =

English footballer

Personal information
- Full name: John William Veitch Shepherd
- Date of birth: 1894
- Place of birth: Harton, England
- Date of death: 1936 (aged 41–42)
- Height: 5 ft 9 in (1.75 m)
- Position: Goalkeeper

Senior career*
Years	Team	Apps	(Gls)
- Harton Colliery
- Jarrow
- Newcastle Swifts
- Jarrow
1921–1923	Ashington	41	(0)
1923	Luton Town	3	(0)
- Workington
- West Stanley
- * Club domestic league appearances and goals

John William Veitch Shepherd (1894–1936) was an English professional footballer who played as a goalkeeper in the Football League for Ashington and Luton Town.

== Personal life ==
Shepherd served in the British Army during the First World War.

== Career statistics ==
Appearances and goals by club, season and competition
Club	Season	League			FA Cup		Total	
Club	Season	Division	Apps	Goals	Apps	Goals	Apps	Goals
Luton Town	1923–24	Third Division	3	0	0	0	3	0
Career total			3	0	0	0	3	0
