= Myrtle Muir =

New Zealand netball coach and administrator

Personal information
- Full name: Myrtle Violet Matilda Muir (Née: Seque)
- Born: 1900 Dunedin, New Zealand
- Died: 1966 (aged 65–66)
- Spouse: Harold Douglas Muir

Netball career
Coaching career
- Years: Team
- 1938; 1948: New Zealand

Myrtle Muir (1900–1966) was the first coach of the New Zealand national netball team in 1938. She was a founder of what would become Netball New Zealand, and served as its president from 1932 to 1949. Little was known about Muir's origins until 2020, when researchers discovered that she was descended from a Chinese settler who worked in the Otago goldfields.

== Early life ==
Myrtle Violet Matilda Muir (née Seque) was the daughter of Edward Seque and Honora Pine. Her father was the son of Wong See Kew (or Que), a Chinese settler who had gone to New Zealand to work in the Otago Gold Fields in 1868, settling in the town of Lawrence and later becoming a market gardener. He married Elizabeth Nesbitt who had been born in Tasmania when it was still a British penal colony. This was one of the first examples of marriage between Chinese men and New Zealand women of British descent and they had seven children. Edward, their eldest son, moved to Dunedin and changed See Que to Seque, enabling him to hide his Chinese ancestry.

Muir attended the Otago Girls' High School (OGHS) in Dunedin. Ruth Fry suggests that the OGHS was the first place in New Zealand where netball was played, although this is disputed. It is, however, clear that the game was being played at the school by the time Muir enrolled, with school records confirming that she was there in 1915. In 1922 she married Harold Douglas Muir. As, according to the convention of the time, she then became Mrs. H. D. Muir, it was only in 2020 that researchers identified her first names. To other people, she was always just known as "Mrs. Muir".

== Netball coaching and administration ==
Muir played netball after leaving school but gave up in 1922 when she married. Again, this was the practice of the time. However, she continued to play an active role in netball, becoming secretary of the Otago netball union. She later moved to Christchurch with her husband for six years and took over the running of its local netball club. In 1924, she and three others got together to organise a netball association. One of the problems with the game at that time was that there were no national rules, the rules varying from city to city. Another problem that became apparent later was that New Zealand teams had nine players, while the rest of the world played with seven.

Muir was appointed president of the association in 1932, a position she held until 1949. During her tenure it was decided that the national team should have a silver fern sewn on their dresses, giving rise to the name Silver Ferns that the team still uses. In 1938, with Muir coaching, the New Zealand team travelled to Melbourne to play against Australia. The team was beaten 40-11, a result attributed in part to the fact that New Zealand was the only country playing under nine-a-side rules, while the game against Australia was seven-a-side. World War II then intervened and it was not until 1948 that an Australian side travelled to New Zealand to play three test matches as well as matches against provincial teams. Muir again coached the national team. New Zealand was still playing nine-a-side in domestic competitions and could not match Australia in the seven-a-side version, although it did win a demonstration match played to nine-a-side rules. The first test match was played in Dunedin, in front of 2000 spectators, an unprecedented number for New Zealand netball.

== Death and legacy ==
Muir died from a heart attack in 1966. She had been instrumental in codifying the rules of netball in New Zealand and in gradually moving the country to harmonise its regulations with those of other netball-playing countries. On 18 October 2026, Muir was posthumously inducted into the Netball New Zealand Hall of Fame.

As a result of the research carried out on Muir's origins, the grave of her grandfather in the Chinese section of Lawrence cemetery was identified and a headstone added.
