= Thomas Kerslake =

English bookseller and antiquarian

Thomas Kerslake (1812–1891) was an English bookseller and antiquarian.

== Life and career ==
Kerslake was born in Exeter in July 1812, proceeded in 1828 to Bristol, and soon afterwards commenced business in second-hand bookselling in Barton Alley, together with his brother-in-law, Samuel Cornish. In 1830 the partnership was dissolved, and Kerslake removed to a shop at the bottom of Park Street. A disastrous fire occurred here in 1860. Kerslake continued on the same site however, until 1870, when he removed to Queen's Road, and shortly afterwards retired. For over twenty years after his retirement he devoted himself to antiquarian controversy. Kerslake died at his private residence, Wynfred, Clevedon, on 5 January 1891. His wife, Catherine Morgan, a native of Bath, predeceased him in 1887. He had no issue.

Previous to the fire, in which many works of great value and scarcity were destroyed, Kerslake had amassed a collection especially valuable in its antiquarian and archæological departments. He was also distinguished as an antiquary. Though self-taught, he had a good command of Latin and of modem languages, and his series of articles and pamphlets on antiquarian subjects is remarkable alike for shrewdness and originality. Kerslake's individuality is well exemplified in his sturdy defence of the historic term "Anglo-Saxon". "His pamphlets were usually published at his own expense".

== Selected publications ==
- A Primeval British Metropolis, with some Notes on the Ancient Topography of the South-Western Peninsula of Britain, Bristol, 1877, 8vo, Revised and re-edited, with additions, under the title of Caer Pensaualcoit, a long-lost Unromanized British Metropolis, London, 1882, 8vo.
- Traces of the Ancient Kingdom of Damnonia, outside Cornwall, in remains of Celtic Hagiology, London, 1878, 8vo.
- Vestiges of the Supremacy of Mercia in the South of England during the Eighth Century, Bristol, 1879, 8vo.
- The Celtic Substratum of England, London, 1883, 8vo.
- The Liberty of Independent Historical Research, London, 1885, 8vo. This is a somewhat caustic attack upon the Ancient Monuments Protection Act 1882 and on a preliminary report entitled Excavations in the Fen Pits, Penselwood, Somerset, issued by General Pitt-Rivers, who would later become the first Inspector of Ancient Monuments.
