= Phil Kerslake =

Welsh-born New Zealand broadcaster, author and speaker (1959 - 2021)

Phil Kerslake MNZM
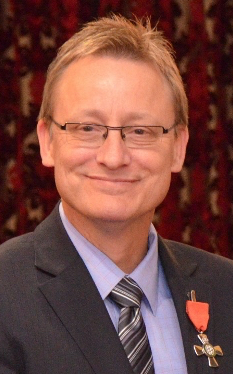
- Kerslake in 2014
- Born: Philip Trevor Kerslake; 24 May 1959; Swansea, Wales
- Died: 11 December 2021
- Occupations: Author, presenter, motivational speaker, cancer patient advocate
- Notable credit: Good Morning
- Spouse: Gillian Kerslake
- Children: 2
- Website: www.lifepaths.co.nz

Philip Trevor Kerslake MNZM (24 May 1959 – 11 December 2021) was a Welsh-born New Zealand speaker, author and television presenter who has appeared on the weekday morning series, Good Morning and in other New Zealand media. He was also a cancer survivor.

== Biography ==
Phil Kerslake was born in Swansea, Wales in 1959, and immigrated to Australia in 1964 and then to New Zealand in 1967. He attended high school at Auckland Grammar School and graduated in 1973.

Kerslake started experiencing symptoms of a lymphoma as a teen, and was given a terminal prognosis when he was 19. He was diagnosed with cancer eight times over the course of his life and underwent a number of treatments. He wrote of his experiences in the 2006 book Life, Happiness... and Cancer: Survive with action and attitude! (ISBN 978-0980417067). The book continues (at 2020) to sell in bulk to cancer support NGO's and others who distribute the work to new patients to help them potentially arehieve better outcomes from their treatments. It was published in paperback in Australia by Fontaine Press, and as an e-book through Amazon.com in 2013.

Kerslake gave talks to cancer patients, cancer support professionals and medical professionals mainly throughout New Zealand on the use of psychosocial support measures to help patients cope with their experiences. He was also a professional motivational speaker, using his life story to discuss coping with multiple cancer diagnoses over more than 40 years.

Phil Kerslake died on 11 December 2021, 43 years after his first cancer diagnosis. Up until his death in 2021, Kerslake divided his time between managing his periodic active treatments, volunteer work in cancer patient support, and paid employment through his motivational talks. He lived in Wellington, New Zealand and is survived by his wife Gillian and their two sons.

== Awards and recognition ==
Kerslake has been recognised widely for his work in cancer patient support. In Vienna, Austria in June 2007, he won an international "Re-Building Lives Award". In 2011 the American Cancer Society appointed Kerslake a "Global Hero of Hope" in Florida, USA. In the 2014 New Year Honours, Kerslake was appointed a Member of the New Zealand Order of Merit, for services to people with cancer.

In 2019 Kerslake received several honours. His Alumni Karate Club, Chidokan Karate-Do International, awarded Kerslake the rank of Shodan, 1st Degree Black Belt, on 1 February 2019. Having had to retire from training at purple belt in 1979 due to his cancer and treatments, the organisation took account of his more than 40 years fighting cancer since.

On 1 August 2019 Kerslake was awarded Life Membership of the Cancer Society of New Zealand, Wellington Division Inc. 'for distinguished services to the Cancer Society.' A wide variety of services and collaborations were delivered over three decades from 1989.

On 1 November 2019 Kerslake was bestowed with the honorary title Te Rangatira Toa Oranga - 'The Chief Wellbeing Warrior,' by The Aratika Cancer Trust (Rotorua). The title was said to be bestowed "for the many years of combating relentless cancer diagnoses and treatments with fierce determination and resilience, just as a fighting warrior should. "We want to thank you for giving hope to many others who have followed your advice about surviving a terminal cancer diagnosis." A tokotoko fitting of this office was also carved and presented to Kerslake. Commissioned by the Trust and "other friends" on Phil's cancer journey (i.e. NGO Leaders including the Chair of the Breast Cancer Aotearoa Coalition). The tokotoko was created by renowned Maori artist and carver Lewis Tamihana Gardiner (Te Arawa/Ngati Awa/Te Whanau-a-Apanui/Ngai Tahu). The tokotoko blessing and presentation was carried out at Te Puna a Tuhoe, Fairy Springs, Rotorua by Te Arawa-Ngati Pikiao Rangatira, Wetini Mitai-Ngatai. ONZM, and Aratika Cancer Trustees, on 8 November 2019.

== See also ==
- List of New Zealand television personalities
