= Wendy Hawke =

New Zealand adoption advocate

Wendy Hawke ONZM
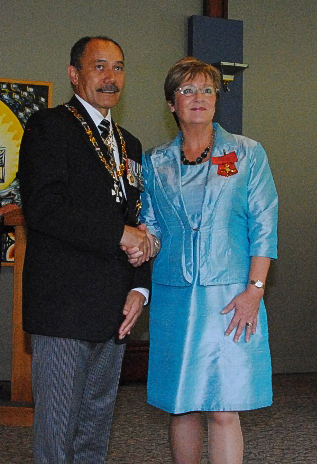
- Hawke in 2014
- Born: Wendy Ruth Hawke; New Zealand
- Years active: 1995 – present
- Spouse: David Hawke (died. 2013)

Wendy Ruth Hawke ONZM is a New Zealand adoption advocate. She has been the executive director of Inter-Country Adoption New Zealand, also known as ICANZ, since 1995. The organisation was founded in 1989.

In 2014 she was made an Officer of the New Zealand Order of Merit for her services to inter-country adoption.

== Early career ==
Hawke was a teacher at St Cuthbert's College, Epsom. After adopting her children from Russia in 1992 through ICANZ, she then went onto volunteering at ICANZ. In 1995, Hawke then became the executive director. Before 1992, ICANZ was facilitating adoptions from Peru and Romania under its original founders.

== Personal life ==
Hawke and her husband David were the first New Zealand couple to adopt from Russia in 1992. Hawke has five children. Four adopted from Russia and one son by birth. Her husband died in 2013 after a long illness.
