= Margaret Gordon Burn =

Margaret Gordon Burn (22 March 1825 – 8 December 1918) was a New Zealand teacher and school principal. She was born in Edinburgh, Midlothian, Scotland on 22 March 1825. She was the founding principal of Otago Girls' High School in 1871, and also founding principal of Waitaki Girls' High School from 1887 to 1892.
