= Kerslake Hall =

- University of Tasmania and Australian Maritime College
- Location: Newnham campus, Launceston, Australia
- Coordinates: 41.401°S 147.125°E
- Established: 1970
- Named for: Irene Kerslake
- Principal: Tania Harvey
- Residents: 109
- Website: Kerslake Hall

Kerslake Hall is a residential college for full-time students of the University of Tasmania and Australian Maritime College. It is situated on the university's Newnham campus, Launceston, Australia. The residence is named after Irene Kerslake MA, a former lecturer at the Tasmanian College of Advanced Education and women's rights campaigner.

The residence offers 107 self-catered rooms.

Kerslake Hall is open to members of the public during university holidays, such as tourists and conference groups.

== History ==
Kerslake Hall was opened in the early 1970s on the site of the Tasmanian College of Advanced Education, which evolved into the Tasmanian Institute of Technology before becoming part of the University of Tasmania in 1990.

Between the early 1970s and 1997, Kerslake Hall operated as a traditional hall of residence, and accommodated 153 fully catered residents annually. With student numbers declining and loss of student interest in catered accommodation, the residence closed in 1998 except for its self-catered wing. In 2001, the residence opened again as a completely self-catered accommodation facility. Saltz Restaurant Cafe was opened on campus in 2009 to offer optional catering for residents.
