= Margaret Gordon (singer) =

Welsh singer (1880 – 1962)

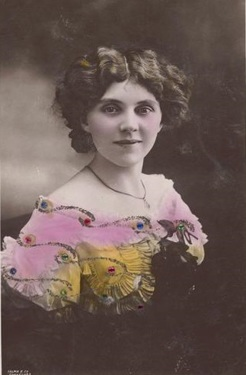
- Born: Margaret Jane Thomas; 3 March 1880; New Quay, Wales
- Died: 23 September 1962; Savernake, England
- Occupation: singer
- Employer: James Cassius Williamson
- Spouse: Alexander Gordon
- Children: two

Lady Margaret Jane Gordon (born Margaret Jane Thomas; 3 March 1880 – 23 September 1962) was a Welsh singer who had a career in Australia. She married her admirer and worked to support good causes.

== Life ==
Gordon was born in New Quay in Wales in 1880. Her parents were Anne and her husband Thomas Thomas. She only spoke Welsh until she was twelve, and she sang at Eisteddfods. She trained as a singer in Cardiff and then at the Royal Academy of Music.

In 1904 she began her singing career in London, where she was discovered by James Cassius Williamson, an American impresario who wanted her to tour in Australia in February and March of the following year. Williamson's new Parkina-Földesy Concert Company was managed by George Tallis. The American soprano Elizabeth Parkina was the star, and Gordon was the contralto with Whitworth Mitton as the tenor. She stayed in Australia and took the lead of Nanoya in The Cingalee for the Royal Comic Opera Company. This musical play had been a hit in London, playing for a year of performances. She appeared in A Country Girl and toured with the company that year, impressing admirers with her acting. Her performances included appearing in André Messager's comic opera Véronique. She played a well received Hélène de Solanger that September in Melbourne.

Her singing career came to an end in May 1906 when she agreed to marry her admirer Alexander Gordon. He was an Australia-born barrister who had initially sent her numerous bouquets of violets anonymously each Saturday night. They returned to her Welsh birthplace where she and Alexander married in the September, witnessed by her sister as bridesmaid and by her mariner father Captain Thomas.

She organised a concert at Sydney Town Hall on 23 June 1915 in aid of the Red Cross. She sang Welsh songs and Antonia Dolores was the main performer. The concert raised over £1,000.

Her husband was knighted in 1930 and she became Lady Margaret Gordon. She lost her hearing but continued in her public life, helping to raise money during the Second World War. Her husband died in 1942. After the war she returned to the UK.

Gordon died in 1962 in Savernake in Wiltshire.
