= Bill Shepherd (politician) =

New Zealand politician

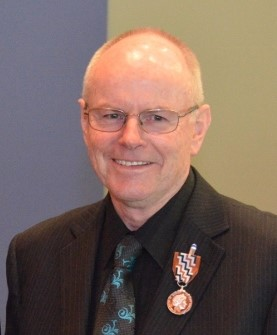
Shepherd in 2014

William Mervyn Shepherd QSM (born 1944 or 1945) was the chairman of the Northland Regional Council in New Zealand from 2013 to 2019.

His constituency was Coastal North. In the 2019 local elections, he failed to be re-elected.

As of 2022, he is campaign chair for Shane Reti.
