= Dawn Jones (netball) =

New Zealand netball umpire and administrator

Dawn Jones CNZM OBE JP
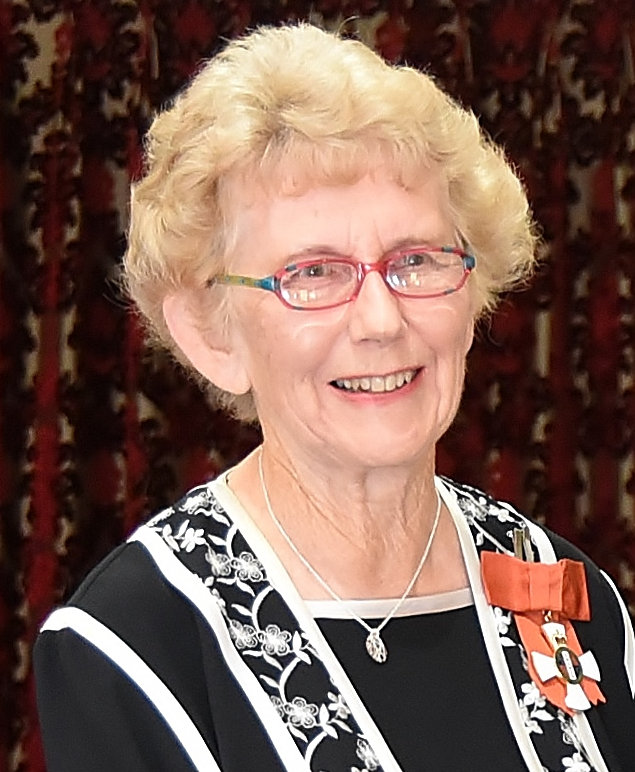
- Jones in 2016

President of Netball New Zealand
- In office 1987–?

Principal of Diocesan School for Girls, Auckland
- In office 1975–1993

Personal details
- Born: Myrlene Dawn Jones; 1940 (age 85–86) Ōtāhuhu, New Zealand
- Occupation: Netball administrator; Schoolteacher

Myrlene Dawn Jones CNZM OBE JP (born 1940) is a New Zealand netball umpire who spent 15 years as New Zealand's top-ranked umpire and officiated at four World Netball Championships. She was also a netball administrator, a school principal and a justice of the peace.

== Early life ==
Jones was born in Ōtāhuhu, a suburb of Auckland. Her father was a wrestler and also coached rugby in Papatoetoe, near Auckland. She attended the Auckland Girls' Grammar School in Newton, where one of her teachers fostered a love of mathematics, at a time when girls were not encouraged to become mathematicians. Jones graduated from the University of Auckland with a Bachelor of Arts degree in 1942. She would go on to work at Papatoetoe High School as a maths teacher.

== Umpiring career ==
In the 1960s Jones obtained local and national umpiring qualifications in netball and in 1974 was appointed to accompany the New Zealand national netball team to England, at the beginning of an international umpiring career in which she was the top-ranked umpire in the country for 15 years. She became president of the New Zealand Umpires Association in 1975. She umpired 85 test matches, including in four world championships and two World Games, together with more than 200 other first-class matches. She became president of Netball New Zealand in 1987. On retiring from active umpiring, she became a member of the International Netball Federation's umpiring committee, chairing its umpiring advisory panel from its establishment in 2008 until 2013, and was a key force behind the introduction of new rules and a new rule book.

== Other activities ==
Between 1975 and 1993 Jones was principal of the Diocesan School for Girls, Auckland. A sports centre at the school was named after her. She also served as a Justice of the peace.

== Awards and honours ==
In the 1994 New Year Honours, Jones was appointed an Officer of the Order of the British Empire, for services to netball and education. In 1999, she was given the Ultimate Umpire Award, on the occasion of Netball New Zealand's 75th anniversary celebrations, for her outstanding umpiring. She has received service awards from the International Netball Federation and Netball New Zealand and was awarded life membership of Netball New Zealand. In 2015, Jones was awarded a lifetime achievement award at the Halberg Awards. In the 2016 Queen's Birthday Honours, she was appointed a Companion of the New Zealand Order of Merit, for services to netball and education.

In 2024, Jones was an inaugural inductee to the Netball New Zealand Hall of Fame, and was accorded "icon status".
