= World Netball =

Worldwide netball governing body

- Poitarawhiti o te Ao (Māori); Wêreldnetbal (Afrikaans)
- Sport: Netball
- Also governs: Fast5 netball
- Jurisdiction: Worldwide
- Membership: 80+ (2025)
- Abbreviation: WN
- Founded: 1960
- Affiliation: Association of IOC Recognised International Sports Federations; International Olympic Committee; International World Games Association
- Location: MediaCityUK; Salford Quays; Salford; Greater Manchester; M50 2AB; England
- President: Liz Nicholl
- CEO: Fiona Harold
- Vice president: Shirley Hooper

Official website
- netball.sport

World Netball is the worldwide governing body for netball. It is responsible for organising the Netball World Cup, Netball at the Commonwealth Games, the Fast5 Netball World Series and the Netball World Youth Cup. It also publishes the World Netball Rankings and maintains the rules of netball. It was originally founded in 1960 as the International Federation of Women's Basketball and Netball Associations. After members adopted the name "netball" for the sport, the organisation was renamed the International Federation of Netball Associations. Between 2012–13 and 2021, it was known as the International Netball Federation, before it adopted its current name.

== Headquarters ==
World Netball is based at MediaCityUK in Salford, England.

== History ==
In 1957, during Australia's tour of England, discussions took place about standardising the rules of netball. In 1960, this led to representatives from Australia, England, New Zealand, South Africa, Wales and the West Indies meeting in Colombo, Ceylon to establish the International Federation of Women's Basketball and Netball Associations. The modern rules of netball were established at this inaugural meeting. It was also agreed to organise the 1963 World Netball Tournament. Lorna McConchie was one of two delegates representing Australia while Lystra Lewis represented the West Indies Netball Board. By the 1970s, netball was no longer referred to as "women's basketball" and national associations, such as the All Australia Netball Association, began to the drop the old name for the sport from their names. The world organisation was also renamed the International Federation of Netball Associations. In 2012–13, the IFNA again changed its name, this time to the International Netball Federation. In June 2021, the INF announced an official rebrand and became known as World Netball.

== Competitions ==
=== Current ===
Years	Competition
1963–	Netball World Cup
1990–	Netball at the Commonwealth Games
1988–	Netball World Youth Cup
2009–	Fast5 Netball World Series
2023–	Fast5 Netball at the Commonwealth Youth Games

=== Former ===
Years	Competition
2012–2018	World University Netball Championship
1985–1993	Netball at the World Games

=== Olympics ===
Since 1995, World Netball has been recognised by the International Olympic Committee. World Netball is also a member of the Association of IOC Recognised International Sports Federations. However, IOC recognition does not mean automatic inclusion in the Summer Olympic Games. World Netball applied for netball to be a part of the 2020 Summer Olympics but was unsuccessful. In August 2021, World Netball declared its intention to work with Netball Australia to make a compelling case for netball's inclusion at the 2032 Summer Olympics. In March 2025, World Netball and Netball Australia met with the 2032 organising committee.

== Regions and members ==
World Netball has over 80 members. This includes full and associate members. World Netball also has five regional federations, representing Africa, the Americas, Asia, Europe and Oceania.

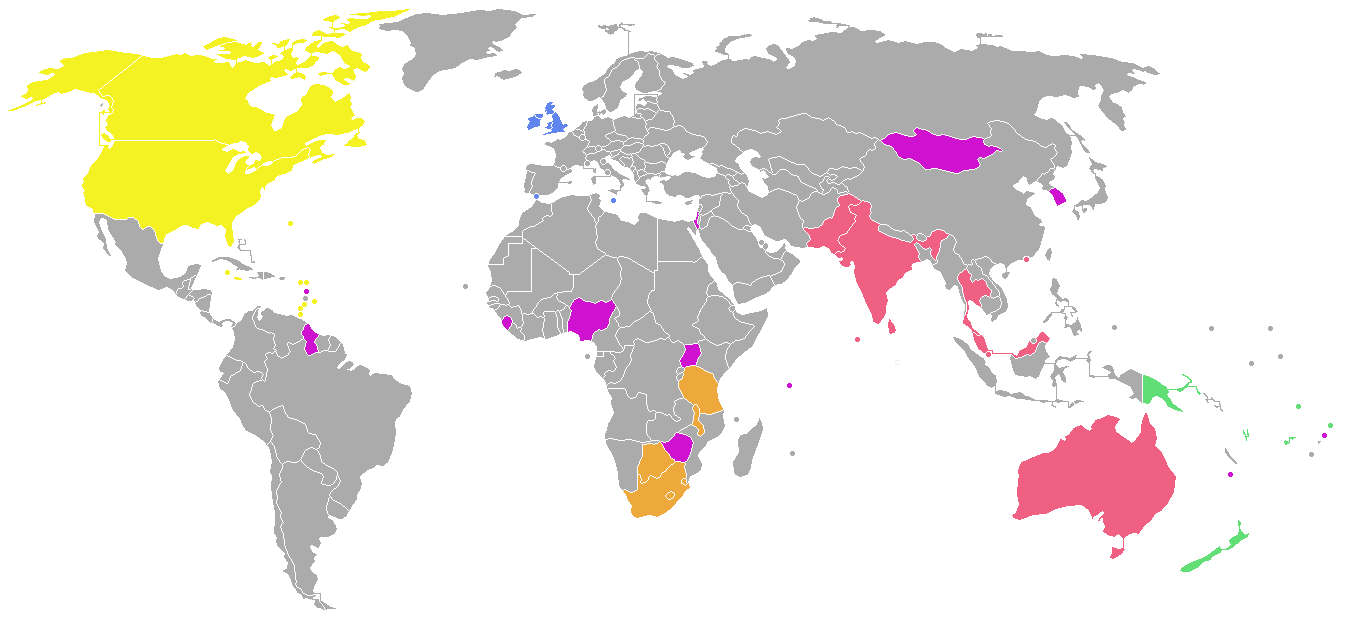
World Netball members

Federation	Full Members	Associate members
Africa Netball	15	3
Americas Netball	18	2
Asia Netball	18	2
Europe Netball	13	3
Oceania Netball	7	2

== Presidents ==
Years	President	Association
1995–1999	Anne Taylor	New Zealand
1999–2003	Sheryl Dawson	New Zealand
2003–2019	Molly Rhone	Jamaica
2019–	Liz Nicholl	Wales
