= 2007 Southern Sting season =

Southern Sting season

Southern Sting
- 2007 season
- Head coach: Robyn Broughton
- Asst. coach: Belinda Colling
- Manager: Kate Mackintosh
- Captain: Jenny Ferguson
- Vice-captain: Adine Wilson
- Main venue: Stadium Southland

Season results
- Wins–losses: 8–2
- Season placing: 1st
- Team colours

Southern Sting seasons
- ← 2006 2008 →

The 2007 Southern Sting season saw the Southern Sting netball team compete in the 2007 National Bank Cup league season. With a team coached by Robyn Broughton, captained by Jenny Ferguson and featuring Liana Barrett-Chase, Daneka Wipiiti, Megan Hutton and Donna Wilkins, Sting finished the season as champions. In the minor semi-final, Sting lost 39–47 to Northern Force and in the major semi-final, they defeated Waikato Bay of Plenty Magic 48–46. In the grand final, Sting defeated Force 50–49 as they won their seventh Coca-Cola Cup/National Bank Cup title. The grand final was Robyn Broughton's 100th match in charge of Sting.

== Players ==
=== Player movements ===
Gains and losses
▲ Gains	▼ Losses
Liana Barrett-Chase (Waikato Bay of Plenty Magic); Erika Burgess (Western Flyers); Daneka Wipiiti (Northern Force)	Belinda Colling assistant coach; Tania Dalton unavailable; Anna Galvan unavailable; Lesley Rumball unavailable

=== 2007 roster ===
2007 Southern Sting roster
Players
Coaching staff

Nat.	Name	Position(s)	DoB	Height
(Australia)	Natalie Avellino	WA, GA, GS	15 December 1970 (aged 36)	1.77 m (5 ft 10 in)
(New Zealand)	Sarah Barnes	WD, GD, GK	(aged 25)	1.80 m (5 ft 11 in)
(New Zealand)	Liana Barrett-Chase	C, WA	31 October 1984 (aged 22)	1.68 m (5 ft 6 in)
(New Zealand)	Erika Burgess	WD, GD	1 October 1984 (aged 22)	1.81 m (5 ft 11 in)
(New Zealand)	Hayley Crofts	WD, C, WA	23 September 1988 (aged 18)	1.73 m (5 ft 8 in)
(New Zealand)	Jenny Ferguson (c)	GD, WD	(aged 27)	1.82 m (6 ft 0 in)
(New Zealand)	Megan Hutton	GK	26 March 1976 (aged 31)	1.87 m (6 ft 2 in)
(New Zealand)	Te Huinga Reo Selby-Rickit	GK, GD	3 April 1989 (aged 18)	1.84 m (6 ft 0 in)
(New Zealand)	Wendy Telfer	WD, C, WA	15 October 1984 (aged 22)	1.74 m (5 ft 9 in)
(New Zealand)	Donna Wilkins	GS, GA	29 April 1978 (aged 29)	1.85 m (6 ft 1 in)
(New Zealand)	Adine Wilson (vc)	WA, C, GA	8 June 1979 (aged 28)	1.80 m (5 ft 11 in)
(New Zealand)	Daneka Wipiiti	GS	8 December 1982 (aged 24)	1.94 m (6 ft 4 in)

Head coach

- (New Zealand) Robyn Broughton

Assistant coach

- (New Zealand) Belinda Colling

Manager: Kate Mackintosh
Physiotherapist:
Neil Familton
Sports Science:
Steve Jackson

Notes

- (c) – Captain
- (cc) – Co-captain
- (vc) – Vice-captain
- – Injury / maternity leave
- (TRP) – Temporary Replacement Player

== Regular season ==
=== Fixtures and results ===
Round 1

Thur, 5 April	Southern Sting	46–51	Northern Force	Stadium Southland
7:30pm		Report

Round 2

Sun, 15 April	Western Flyers	34–67	Southern Sting	Napier
1:00pm

Round 3

Sat, 21 April	Southern Sting	81–33	Capital Shakers	Stadium Southland
7:30pm

Round 4

Sat, 28 April	Southern Sting	65–44	Waikato Bay of Plenty Magic	Stadium Southland
4:00pm		Report

Round 5

Sun, 29 April	Otago Rebels	50–60	Southern Sting	Edgar Centre
1:00pm

Round 6

Sat, 26 May	Auckland Diamonds	42–50	Southern Sting	Trusts Stadium
7:30pm

Round 7

Sat, 2 June	Canterbury Flames	46–54	Southern Sting	Westpac Centre
4:00pm		Report

=== Final table ===
2007 National Bank Cup ladder
Pos	Team	Pld	W	L	BP	GF	GA	Pts
1	Southern Sting	7	6	1	1	423	300	19
2	Northern Force	7	5	2	2	361	317	17
3	Waikato Bay of Plenty Magic	7	5	2	1	385	320	16
4	Auckland Diamonds	7	5	2	0	339	313	15
5	Canterbury Flames	7	4	3	0	342	323	12
6	Otago Rebels	7	2	5	4	324	325	10
7	Capital Shakers	7	1	6	2	285	372	5
8	Western Flyers	7	0	7	0	241	430	0

Qualified for Major semi-final
Qualified for Minor semi-final

- Pld = Games played
- W = Win (3 points)
- L = Loss (0 points)
- BP = Losing team within 5 points of winner (1 point)
- GF = Goals For
- GA = Goals Against

Pts = Points

== Finals series ==
=== Major semi-final ===
Fri, 8 June; 7:30pm	Southern Sting	39–47	Northern Force	Stadium Southland	ONESport
Fri, 8 June; 7:30pm	Scoring by quarter: 16–13, 20–28, 33–36, 39–47			Stadium Southland	ONESport
Fri, 8 June; 7:30pm	Daneka Wipiiti 20/30 (67%); Donna Wilkins 19/23 (83%)		Catherine Latu 29/34 (85%); Megan Dehn 18/22 (82%)	Stadium Southland	ONESport

=== Preliminary final ===
Fri, 15 June; 7:30pm	Stats	Southern Sting	48–46	Waikato Bay of Plenty Magic	Stadium Southland	ONESport
Fri, 15 June; 7:30pm	Stats	Scoring by quarter: 14–10, 23–22, 36–35, 48–46			Stadium Southland	ONESport
Fri, 15 June; 7:30pm	Stats	Donna Wilkins 33/37 (89%); Daneka Wipiiti 15/26 (58%)		Irene van Dyk 40/42 (95%); Tanya Lund 6/9 (67%)	Stadium Southland	ONESport

=== Grand final ===
Fri, 22 June; 7:30pm	Southern Sting	50–49	Northern Force	North Shore Events Centre	ONESport

== Gallery ==
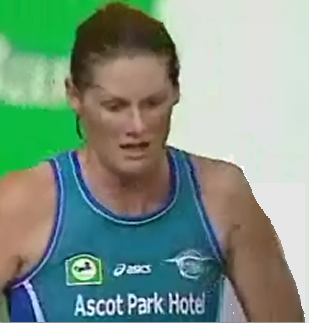
Donna Wilkins playing for the 2007 Southern Sting team.
