= 2005 Southern Sting season =

Southern Sting season

Southern Sting
- 2005 season
- Head coach: Robyn Broughton
- Asst. coach: Tania Dalton
- Manager: Kate Mackintosh
- Captain: Lesley Rumball
- Main venue: Stadium Southland

Season results
- Wins–losses: 6–4
- Season placing: 2nd
- Team colours

Southern Sting seasons
- ← 2004 2006 →

The 2005 Southern Sting season saw the Southern Sting netball team compete in the 2005 National Bank Cup league season. With a team coached by Robyn Broughton, captained by Lesley Rumball and featuring Tania Dalton, Donna Loffhagen, Wendy Telfer and Adine Wilson, Sting finished the season as grand finalists and runners up to Waikato Bay of Plenty Magic. After winning four matches and losing three during the regular season, Sting qualified for the final series. In the minor semi-final they defeated Auckland Diamonds 52–48 and in the preliminary final they defeated Northern Force 47–44. However, in the grand final they lost 65–39 to Magic.

== Players ==
=== Player movements ===
Gains and losses
▲ Gains	▼ Losses
Megan Hutton (Capital Shakers); Katie Fay; Renee Jacobsen	Natalie Avellino (Adelaide Thunderbirds); Emma Moynihan; Reinga Te Huia (pregnancy)

=== 2005 roster ===
2005 Southern Sting roster
Players
Coaching staff

Nat.	Name	Position(s)	DoB	Height
(New Zealand)	Sarah Barnes	WD, GD, GK	(aged 23)	1.80 m (5 ft 11 in)
(New Zealand)	Tania Dalton	GS, GA	26 November 1971 (aged 33)	1.84 m (6 ft 0 in)
(New Zealand)	Jenny Ferguson	GD, WD	(aged 26)	1.82 m (6 ft 0 in)
(New Zealand)	Anna Galvan	GK, GD, WD	20 November 1978 (aged 26)	1.84 m (6 ft 0 in)
(New Zealand)	Katie Fay^{1} (TRP)	GK		–
(New Zealand)	Megan Hutton	GK	26 March 1976 (aged 29)	1.87 m (6 ft 2 in)
(New Zealand)	Renee Jacobsen			–
(New Zealand)	Donna Loffhagen	GS, GA	29 April 1978 (aged 26)	1.85 m (6 ft 1 in)
(New Zealand)	Lesley Rumball (c)	WD, C	9 May 1973 (aged 31)	1.78 m (5 ft 10 in)
(New Zealand)	Kylie Smith			–
(New Zealand)	Debbie Telfer			–
(New Zealand)	Wendy Telfer	WD, C, WA	15 October 1984 (aged 20)	1.74 m (5 ft 9 in)
(New Zealand)	Adine Wilson	WA, C, GA	8 June 1979 (aged 25)	1.76 m (5 ft 9 in)

Head coach

- (New Zealand) Robyn Broughton

Manager: Kate Mackintosh
Physiotherapist:
Neil Familton
Sports Science:
Steve Jackson

Notes

- (c) – Captain
- (cc) – Co-captain
- (vc) – Vice-captain
- – Injury / maternity leave
- (TRP) – Temporary Replacement Player

Notes

- ^1 With Adine Wilson, Megan Hutton, Anna Galvan and Lesley Rumball all suffering injuries, Katie Fay, formerly of Otago Rebels and Auckland Diamonds, was called up as a temporary replacement player for the Round 5 match against Waikato Bay of Plenty Magic.

== Regular season ==
=== Fixtures and results ===
Round 1

Sun, 10 April	Western Flyers	38–46	Southern Sting	New Plymouth
11.30am

Round 2

Sun, 17 April	Southern Sting	55–33	Capital Shakers	Stadium Southland
1.00pm

Round 3

Sat, 23 April	Otago Rebels	39–54	Southern Sting	Edgar Centre
7.00pm		Report

Round 4

Sun, 1 May	Auckland Diamonds	44–40	Southern Sting	Auckland
1.00pm

Round 5

Sat, 6 May	Southern Sting	42–56	Waikato Bay of Plenty Magic	Stadium Southland
4.00pm		Report

Round 6

Sun, 15 May	Southern Sting	53–57	Northern Force	Stadium Southland
1.00pm		Report

Round 7

Fri, 21 May	Canterbury Flames	41–50	Southern Sting	Christchurch
7.30pm		Report

== Finals series ==
=== Minor semi-final ===
Sun, 29 June; 1:00pm	Auckland Diamonds	48–52	Southern Sting	Auckland	ONESport
Sun, 29 June; 1:00pm	Scoring by quarter: ?–?, 27–24, ?–?, 48–52			Auckland	ONESport

=== Preliminary final ===
Fri, 3 June; 7:30pm	Northern Force	44–47	Southern Sting	North Shore Events Centre	ONESport
Fri, 3 June; 7:30pm	Scoring by quarter: 10–9, 20–22, ?–?, 44–47			North Shore Events Centre	ONESport

=== Grand final ===
Fri, 10 June	Southern Sting	39–65	Waikato Bay of Plenty Magic	Stadium Southland; Attendance: 4,000	ONESport
Fri, 10 June	Scoring by quarter: 9–17, 16–33, 28–46, 39–65			Stadium Southland; Attendance: 4,000	ONESport
