= 2002 Southern Sting season =

Southern Sting season

Southern Sting
- 2002 season
- Head coach: Robyn Broughton
- Manager: Jackie Barron
- Captain: Bernice Mene
- Main venue: Stadium Southland

Season results
- Wins–losses: 10–0
- Season placing: 1st
- Team colours

Southern Sting seasons
- ← 2001 2003 →

The 2002 Southern Sting season saw the Southern Sting netball team compete in the 2002 National Bank Cup league season. With a team coached by Robyn Broughton, captained by Bernice Mene and featuring Reinga Bloxham, Tania Dalton, Adine Harper, Donna Loffhagen and Lesley Nicol, Sting won their fourth league title. Sting went through the season unbeaten, winning all ten of their matches. In the semi-final, they defeated Capital Shakers 68–49. In the grand final, they defeated Canterbury Flames 54–48.

== Players ==
=== Player movements ===
Gains and losses
| ▲ Gains | ▼ Losses |
|---|---|
| Tania Dalton; Debbie Munro; Wendy Telfer; Kylie Young | Rachel Gill; Leana du Plooy (Capital Shakers); Janine Topia |

=== 2002 roster ===
2002 Southern Sting roster
Players
Coaching staff

| Nat. | Name | Position(s) | DoB | Height |
|---|---|---|---|---|
| (New Zealand) | Reinga Bloxham | WD, C | (aged 27) | – |
| (New Zealand) | Kirsty Broughton | WD, C | | – |
| (New Zealand) | Tania Dalton | GS, GA | 26 November 1971 (aged 30) | 1.84 m (6 ft 0 in) |
| (New Zealand) | Adine Harper | WA, C, GA | 8 June 1979 (aged 22) | 1.76 m (5 ft 9 in) |
| (New Zealand) | Megan Hutton | GK | 26 March 1976 (aged 26) | 1.87 m (6 ft 2 in) |
| (New Zealand) | Donna Loffhagen | GS, GA | 29 April 1978 (aged 23) | 1.85 m (6 ft 1 in) |
| (New Zealand) | Bernice Mene (c) | GD, GK | 18 January 1975 (aged 27) | 1.88 m (6 ft 2 in) |
| (New Zealand) | Debbie Munro | GS, GA | | – |
| (New Zealand) | Kate Newson | | | – |
| (New Zealand) | Lesley Nicol | WD, C | 9 May 1973 (aged 28) | 1.78 m (5 ft 10 in) |
| (New Zealand) | Jo Tapper | | | – |
| (New Zealand) | Wendy Telfer | WD, C, WA | 15 October 1984 (aged 17) | 1.74 m (5 ft 9 in) |
| (New Zealand) | Kylie Young | | | – |

Head coach

- (New Zealand) Robyn Broughton

Manager: Jackie Barron
Physiotherapist:
Neil Familton
Sports Science:
Steve Jackson
Marketing & Events Manager:
Liz McDonald
Sponsorship Manager:
Liz McDonald
Office Administrator:
Judy Fleck

Notes

- (c) – Captain
- (cc) – Co-captain
- (vc) – Vice-captain
- – Injury / maternity leave
- (TRP) – Temporary Replacement Player

== Stats ==
Sting went through the season unbeaten, winning all ten of their matches. Their dominance was such that Tania Dalton and Donna Loffhagen had the best attacking record of 490 goals for and Bernice Mene and Megan Hutton had the best defensive record of 327 against.

== Regular season ==
=== Fixtures and results ===
Round 1

| 6 April | Otago Rebels | 32–64 | Southern Sting | Edgar Centre |
| | Katie Ritchie 18/33 (55%); C. O'Connor 8/10 (80%); J. Brown 6/7 (86%) | Report | Tania Dalton 33/37 (89%); Donna Loffhagen 31/34 (91%) |

Round 2

Southern Sting received a bye.

Round 3

| 21 April | Southern Sting | 52–43 | Auckland Diamonds | Stadium Southland |

Round 4

| 27 April | Southern Sting | 53–38 | Capital Shakers | Stadium Southland |
| | | Report |

Round 5

| 3 May | Counties Manukau Cometz | 34–82 | Southern Sting | Papatoetoe |
| | | Report |

Round 6

| 5 May | Northern Force | 44–48 | Southern Sting | North Shore Events Centre |
| | | Report |

Round 7

| 11 May | Southern Sting | 77–41 | Western Flyers | Stadium Southland |
| | | Report |

Round 8

| 18 May | Southern Sting | 53–47 | Canterbury Flames | Stadium Southland |

Round 9

| 26 May | Waikato Bay of Plenty Magic | 48–61 | Southern Sting | Mystery Creek Events Centre |
| | | Report |

== Finals series ==
=== Semi-final ===
| 2 June | Report | Southern Sting | 68–49 | Capital Shakers | Stadium Southland |

=== Grand final ===
| 8 June | Southern Sting | 54–48 | Canterbury Flames | Stadium Southland; Attendance: 4,000 |
| 8 June | Scoring by quarter: 13–15, 27–24, 39–38, 54–48 | | | Stadium Southland; Attendance: 4,000 |
