= 2001 Southern Sting season =

Southern Sting season

Southern Sting
- 2001 season
- Head coach: Robyn Broughton
- Manager: Jackie Barron
- Captain: Bernice Mene
- Main venue: Stadium Southland

Season results
- Wins–losses: 8–2
- Season placing: 1st
- Team colours

Southern Sting seasons
- ← 2000 2002 →

The 2001 Southern Sting season saw the Southern Sting netball team compete in the 2001 Coca-Cola Cup league season. With a team coached by Robyn Broughton, captained by Bernice Mene and featuring Reinga Bloxham, Adine Harper, Donna Loffhagen, Lesley Nicol and Leana de Bruin (née du Plooy), Sting won their third Coca-Cola Cup title. In the semi-final, they defeated Capital Shakers 60–49. In the grand final, they defeated Canterbury Flames 47–44.

== Players ==
=== Player movements ===
Gains and losses
▲ Gains	▼ Losses
Reinga Bloxham; Adine Harper (Otago Rebels); Megan Hutton (Canterbury Flames); Leana du Plooy (South Africa)	Julie Carter (retirement); Michelle Krynen; Bulou Rabuka; Maria O'Neill

=== 2001 roster ===
2001 Southern Sting roster
Players
Coaching staff

Nat.	Name	Position(s)	DoB	Height
(New Zealand)	Reinga Bloxham	WD, C	(aged 26)	–
(New Zealand)	Kirsty Broughton	WD, C		–
(New Zealand)	Adine Harper	WA, C, GA	8 June 1979 (aged 21)	1.76 m (5 ft 9 in)
(New Zealand)	Megan Hutton	GK	26 March 1976 (aged 25)	1.87 m (6 ft 2 in)
(New Zealand)	Rachel Gill			–
(New Zealand)	Donna Loffhagen	GS, GA	29 April 1978 (aged 22)	1.85 m (6 ft 1 in)
(New Zealand)	Bernice Mene (c)	GD, GK	18 January 1975 (aged 26)	1.88 m (6 ft 2 in)
(New Zealand)	Kate Newson			–
(New Zealand)	Lesley Nicol	WD, C	9 May 1973 (aged 27)	1.78 m (5 ft 10 in)
(South Africa)	Leana du Plooy	GD, GK	9 July 1977 (aged 23)	1.90 m (6 ft 3 in)
(New Zealand)	Jo Tapper			–
(New Zealand)	Janine Topia			–

Head coach

- (New Zealand) Robyn Broughton

Manager: Jackie Barron
Physiotherapist:
Neil Familton
Sports Science:
Steve Jackson
Marketing & Events Manager:
Liz McDonald
Sponsorship Manager & Office Administrator:
Robyn Koehler

Notes

- (c) – Captain
- (cc) – Co-captain
- (vc) – Vice-captain
- – Injury / maternity leave
- (TRP) – Temporary Replacement Player

== Regular season ==
In Round 4 of the regular season, Sting lost 51–48 to an Irene van Dyk inspired Capital Shakers. The loss ended a winning run of 18 matches over two years for Sting. In Round 8, Sting lost a second match, losing 46–44 to Waikato Bay of Plenty Magic. Two losses meant Sting were in 4th place and in danger of not qualifying for the semi-finals. Sting had to beat the league leaders, Canterbury Flames, in their Round 9 match to make certain they reached the semi-finals.

=== Fixtures and results ===
Round 1

Southern Sting received a bye.

Round 2

31 March	Southern Sting	58–26	Otago Rebels	Stadium Southland
		Report

Round 3

7 April	Auckland Diamonds	51–58	Southern Sting	Auckland
		Report

Round 4

22 April	Capital Shakers	51–48	Southern Sting	Wellington
	Irene van Dyk ^{(Note 1)}		Donna Loffhagen 11/11 (100%)	Attendance: 3,000

Round 5

27 April	Western Flyers	44–68	Southern Sting	New Plymouth

Round 6

29 April	Southern Sting	50–41	Northern Force	Stadium Southland
		Report

Round 7

4 May	Southern Sting	62–42	Counties Manukau Cometz	Stadium Southland
		Report		Attendance: 4,100

Round 8

May 6	Southern Sting	44–46	Waikato Bay of Plenty Magic	Stadium Southland
				Attendance: 4,100

Round 9

13 May	Canterbury Flames	47–59	Southern Sting	Christchurch
		Report

Notes

- ^1 Reports give Irene van Dyk's shooting stats as either 38/40 (95%) or 35/39 (90%).

== Finals series ==
=== Semi-final ===
18 May	Southern Sting	60–49	Capital Shakers	Stadium Southland; Attendance: 4,100
18 May	Scoring by quarter: 14–14, 29–24, 46–36, 60–49			Stadium Southland; Attendance: 4,100
18 May	Janine Topia 35/46 (76%)			Stadium Southland; Attendance: 4,100

=== Grand final ===
26 May	Southern Sting	47–44	Canterbury Flames	Stadium Southland; Attendance: 4,100
26 May	Scoring by quarter: 13–12, 27–20, 38–33, 47–44			Stadium Southland; Attendance: 4,100
