= 2006 Southern Sting season =

Southern Sting season

Southern Sting
- 2006 season
- Head coach: Robyn Broughton
- Asst. coach: Tania Dalton
- Manager: Kate Mackintosh
- Main venue: Stadium Southland

Season results
- Wins–losses: 6–4
- Season placing: 2nd
- Team colours

Southern Sting seasons
- ← 2005 2007 →

The 2006 Southern Sting season saw the Southern Sting netball team compete in the 2006 National Bank Cup league season. With a team coached by Robyn Broughton and featuring Tania Dalton, Donna Loffhagen, Wendy Telfer, Lesley Rumball and Adine Wilson, Sting finished the regular season as minor premiers. However, they subsequently lost the major semi-final to Waikato Bay of Plenty Magic 61–51. In the preliminary final they defeated Northern Force 64–59. In the grand final they lost 67–43 to Magic and finished the season as runners up.

== Players ==
=== Player movements ===
Gains and losses
▲ Gains	▼ Losses
Natalie Avellino; Belinda Colling (Team Northumbria); Hayley Crofts; Te Huinga Reo Selby-Rickit (Western Flyers)	Katie Fay; Renee Jacobsen; Kylie Smith; Debbie Telfer

=== 2006 roster ===
2006 Southern Sting roster
Players
Coaching staff

Nat.	Name	Position(s)	DoB	Height
(Australia)	Natalie Avellino	WA, GA, GS	15 December 1970 (aged 35)	1.77 m (5 ft 10 in)
(New Zealand)	Sarah Barnes	WD, GD, GK	(aged 24)	1.80 m (5 ft 11 in)
(New Zealand)	Belinda Colling	GA, WA	12 September 1975 (aged 30)	1.78 m (5 ft 10 in)
(New Zealand)	Hayley Crofts	WD, C, WA	23 September 1988 (aged 17)	1.73 m (5 ft 8 in)
(New Zealand)	Tania Dalton	GS, GA	26 November 1971 (aged 34)	1.84 m (6 ft 0 in)
(New Zealand)	Jenny Ferguson	GD, WD	(aged 27)	1.82 m (6 ft 0 in)
(New Zealand)	Anna Galvan	GK, GD, WD	20 November 1978 (aged 27)	1.84 m (6 ft 0 in)
(New Zealand)	Megan Hutton	GK	26 March 1976 (aged 30)	1.87 m (6 ft 2 in)
(New Zealand)	Donna Loffhagen^{1}	GS, GA	29 April 1978 (aged 28)	1.85 m (6 ft 1 in)
(New Zealand)	Lesley Rumball	WD, C	9 May 1973 (aged 32)	1.78 m (5 ft 10 in)
(New Zealand)	Te Huinga Reo Selby-Rickit	GK, GD	3 April 1989 (aged 17)	1.84 m (6 ft 0 in)
(New Zealand)	Wendy Telfer	WD, C, WA	15 October 1984 (aged 21)	1.74 m (5 ft 9 in)
(New Zealand)	Adine Wilson	WA, C, GA	8 June 1979 (aged 26)	1.76 m (5 ft 9 in)

Head coach

- (New Zealand) Robyn Broughton

Manager: Kate Mackintosh
Physiotherapist:
Neil Familton
Sports Science:
Steve Jackson

Notes

- (c) – Captain
- (cc) – Co-captain
- (vc) – Vice-captain
- – Injury / maternity leave
- (TRP) – Temporary Replacement Player

Notes

- ^1 Donna Loffhagen missed the regular season. Loffhagen, who also captained the New Zealand women's national basketball team, was making an unsuccessful attempt at securing a Women's National Basketball Association contract. She returned to play against Northern Force in the preliminary final and Waikato Bay of Plenty Magic in the grand final.

== Regular season ==
=== Fixtures and results ===
Round 1

Sat, 29 April	Waikato Bay of Plenty Magic	59–58	Southern Sting	Mystery Creek Events Centre

Round 2

Mon, 8 May	Southern Sting	78–33	Western Flyers	Stadium Southland

Round 3

Sat, 13 May	Southern Sting	61–38	Otago Rebels	Stadium Southland
4:00pm	Tania Dalton 28/29 (97%); Belinda Colling (86%); Natalie Avellino (82%)	Report	Angela Mitchell 30/45 (67%)

Round 4

Sun, 21 May	Northern Force	48–52	Southern Sting	North Shore Events Centre
	Megan Dehn; Catherine Latu	Report	Tania Dalton 29/30 (97%)

Round 5

Sat, 27 May	Southern Sting	55–44	Auckland Diamonds	Stadium Southland

Round 6

Sun, 4 June	Capital Shakers	43–62	Southern Sting	Events Centre, Wellington
		Report

Round 7

Mon, 12 June	Southern Sting	48–51	Canterbury Flames	Stadium Southland
	Tania Dalton 22/23 (96%); Natalie Avellino 18/23 (78%); Belinda Colling 8/11 (73%)		Jade Topia 31/39 (79%); Shelley Norris 20/21 (95%)

=== Regular season statistics ===
Goal Shooters (by Goals Scored)
Pos.	Player	Goals (%)
1	Tania Dalton	154/157 (98%)
2	Natalie Avellino	127/158 (80%)
3	Belinda Colling	118/146 (81%)
4	Te Huinga Reo Selby-Rickit	15/18 (83%)

=== Final table ===
2006 National Bank Cup ladder
Pos	Team	Pld	W	L	BP	GF	GA	Pts
1	Southern Sting	7	5	2	2	414	316	17
2	Waikato Bay of Plenty Magic	7	5	2	2	394	302	17
3	Northern Force	7	5	2	2	354	273	17
4	Canterbury Flames	7	5	2	1	324	275	16
5	Auckland Diamonds	7	5	2	1	336	293	16
6	Capital Shakers	7	2	5	1	295	378	7
7	Otago Rebels	7	1	6	0	265	361	3
8	Western Flyers	7	0	7	1	238	422	1

Qualified for Semi-final 1 (major semi-final)
Qualified for Semi-final 2 (minor semi-final)

- Pld = Games played
- W = Win (3 points)
- L = Loss (0 points)
- BP = Losing team within 5 points of winner (1 point)
- GF = Goals For
- GA = Goals Against

Pts = Points

== Finals series ==
=== Semi-final 1 (major semi-final) ===
Fri, 16 June; 7.30pm	Southern Sting	51–61	Waikato Bay of Plenty Magic	Stadium Southland	ONESport
Fri, 16 June; 7.30pm	Tania Dalton 33/37 (89%); Belinda Colling 11/14 (79%); Natalie Avellino 7/10 (70%)		Irene van Dyk 43/44 (98%); Tanya Lund 18/23 (78%)	Stadium Southland	ONESport

=== Semi-final 3 (preliminary final) ===
Fri, 23 June; 7:30pm	Southern Sting	64–59	Northern Force	Stadium Southland	ONESport

=== Grand final ===
Fri, 30 June; 7:30pm	Waikato Bay of Plenty Magic	67–43	Southern Sting	Mystery Creek Events Centre	ONESport
Fri, 30 June; 7:30pm	Scoring by quarter: 14–12, 32–27, 45–35, 67–43			Mystery Creek Events Centre	ONESport
