= Netball at the 2002 Commonwealth Games squads =

Netball players at the 2002 Commonwealth Games

This is a list of netball players at the 2002 Commonwealth Games.

== Group A ==
=== Canada ===
Canada roster
Players
Coaches

Name	Pos	DOB	Height	Club	Nat	Caps
Zoe Baldwin			–
Joanne Burns Millar			–
Sharon Butler (cc)	C		–
Patricia Carlson	GS, GA		–
Dana Graf			–
Shawnette Hardware			–
Maria Hodgins			–
Maralyn Hope	GS, GA		–
Shirley Anne McKenzie			–
Emma O'Donnell			–
Shelley Sung			–
Sheryl Thorpe			–
Dulcina Wind (cc)	GS, GA		–

Head coach

- ??

Notes

- (c) – Captain
- (cc) – Co-captain
- (vc) – Vice-captain
- – Injury / maternity leave
- (TRP) – Temporary Replacement Player

=== England ===
England roster
Players
Coaches

Name	Pos	DOB	Height	Club	Nat	Caps
Karen Aspinall	WA, C	7 June 1978 (aged 24)	1.68 m (5 ft 6 in)	Birmingham Blaze
Alex Astle	GA, GS	19 March 1972 (aged 30)	–	Birmingham Blaze
Pamela Cookey	GA, GS, WA	2 September 1984 (aged 17)	1.78 m (5 ft 10 in)	Team Bath Force
Jess Garland	WA, GA	15 November 1979 (aged 22)	1.76 m (5 ft 9 in)	Team Bath Force
Geva Mentor	GK, GD	17 September 1984 (aged 17)	1.88 m (6 ft 2 in)	Team Bath Force
Sonia Mkoloma	GD, GK	17 January 1979 (aged 23)	1.86 m (6 ft 1 in)	London Tornadoes
Olivia Murphy (c)	C, WA	24 April 1977 (aged 25)	1.74 m (5 ft 9 in)	Northern Flames
Fiona Murtagh	C, WD	30 April 1967 (aged 35)	–	London Hurricanes
Tracey Neville	WA, GA	21 January 1977 (aged 25)	1.73 m (5 ft 8 in)	Northern Thunder
Amanda Newton (vc)	GD, WD, GK	8 April 1977 (aged 25)	–	Northern Thunder
Naomi Siddall	GD, GK	2 April 1975 (aged 27)	1.82 m (6 ft 0 in)	London Hurricanes
Joanne Steed	GS	20 March 1975 (aged 27)	1.84 m (6 ft 0 in)	London Tornadoes
Abby Teare	GA, GS	25 May 1977 (aged 25)	1.81 m (5 ft 11 in)	London Hurricanes

Head coach

- Lyn Gunson

Assistant coach

- Waimarama Taumaunu

Notes

- (c) – Captain
- (cc) – Co-captain
- (vc) – Vice-captain
- – Injury / maternity leave
- (TRP) – Temporary Replacement Player

=== New Zealand ===
New Zealand roster
Players
Coaches

Name	Pos	DOB	Height	Club	Nat	Caps
Jenny-May Coffin	WA, C	9 April 1974 (aged 28)	1.70 m (5 ft 7 in)	Waikato Bay of Plenty Magic
Belinda Colling	GA, GS, WA	12 September 1975 (aged 26)	1.78 m (5 ft 10 in)	Canterbury Flames
Vilimaina Davu	GK	15 January 1977 (aged 25)	1.90 m (6 ft 3 in)	Canterbury Flames
Sheryl Clarke	GD, WD	8 September 1977 (aged 24)	1.78 m (5 ft 10 in)	Northern Force
Donna Loffhagen	GA, GS	29 April 1978 (aged 24)	1.85 m (6 ft 1 in)	Southern Sting
Lesley Nicol	WD, C	9 May 1973 (aged 29)	1.78 m (5 ft 10 in)	Southern Sting
Anna Rowberry	GD	31 March 1976 (aged 26)	1.76 m (5 ft 9 in)	Auckland Diamonds
Julie Seymour (c)	C, WD	29 March 1971 (aged 31)	1.71 m (5 ft 7 in)	Canterbury Flames
Linda Vagana	GK, GD	23 July 1971 (aged 31)	1.87 m (6 ft 2 in)	Northern Force
Irene van Dyk	GS, GA	21 June 1972 (aged 30)	1.90 m (6 ft 3 in)	Capital Shakers
Anna Veronese	GK, GD, WD	20 November 1978 (aged 23)	1.84 m (6 ft 0 in)	Southern Sting
Daneka Wipiiti	GS	8 December 1982 (aged 19)	1.94 m (6 ft 4 in)	Northern Force

Head coach

- Ruth Aitken

Notes

- (c) – Captain
- (cc) – Co-captain
- (vc) – Vice-captain
- – Injury / maternity leave
- (TRP) – Temporary Replacement Player

=== Sri Lanka ===
Sri Lanka roster
Players
Coaches

Name	Pos	DOB	Height	Club	Nat	Caps
Thushari Dissanayake			–
Gishanthi Jayakody	GS, GA		–
Sandhya Jayasuriya			–
Damayanthi Jayathilaka			–
Arunika Karawitage			–
Anjana Kulari			–
Gayathri Lankatilleke	WD		–
Dammika Malkanthi			–
Prasadi Nalika	GS, GA		–
Sashika Samarasinghe	GS, GA		–
Anoma Sriyakanthi			–
Harshanie Wijayalath	GD		–

Head coach

- ??

Notes

- (c) – Captain
- (cc) – Co-captain
- (vc) – Vice-captain
- – Injury / maternity leave
- (TRP) – Temporary Replacement Player

=== Wales ===
Wales roster
Players
Coaches

Name	Pos	DOB	Height	Club	Nat	Caps
Ceri Battle	WD, C		–	Glamorgan Valleys
Emma Blanks	GK, GD		–	South East Wales
Ursula Bowers	WD, GD, GK, C	29 June 1978 (aged 24)	1.81 m (5 ft 11 in)	Team Bath Force
Helen Case	WA, C		–	Afan Nedd Tawe
Dawn Donovan (vc)	GS, GA, WD, GD, GK		–	Glamorgan Valleys
Sian Edwards	GA, WA		–	South East Wales
Gemma Evans	C, WD		–	Cardiff & District
Joanna Griffiths (c)	WD, GD, C		–	Cardiff & District
Sara Hale	GK, GD, WD	7 October 1982 (aged 19)	1.76 m (5 ft 9 in)	UWIC
Jamilla Harris	GS, GA	27 August 1979 (aged 22)	1.88 m (6 ft 2 in)	Cardiff & District
Mair Jones	GS		–	Dyfed
Anna Mayes	WA, C	8 February 1981 (aged 21)	1.65 m (5 ft 5 in)	Team Bath Force

Head coach

- Raewyn Henry

Notes

- (c) – Captain
- (cc) – Co-captain
- (vc) – Vice-captain
- – Injury / maternity leave
- (TRP) – Temporary Replacement Player

== Group B ==
=== Australia ===
Australia roster
Players
Coaches

Name	Pos	DOB	Height	Club	Nat	Caps
Catherine Cox	GS, GA	24 May 1976 (aged 26)	1.88 m (6 ft 2 in)	Sydney Swifts
Alison Broadbent			–
Jacqui Delaney	GA, WA		–	Adelaide Thunderbirds
Liz Ellis	GK	17 January 1973 (aged 29)	1.83 m (6 ft 0 in)	Sydney Swifts
Kathryn Harby-Williams (c)	GD, WD	16 July 1969 (aged 33)	1.79 m (5 ft 10 in)	Adelaide Thunderbirds
Alexandra Hodge	WA, C	30 September 1977 (aged 24)	1.70 m (5 ft 7 in)
Janine Ilitch	GD, GK	27 January 1972 (aged 30)	1.83 m (6 ft 0 in)	Melbourne Kestrels
Sharelle McMahon	GA, GS	12 August 1977 (aged 24)	1.77 m (5 ft 10 in)	Melbourne Phoenix
Nicole Richardson	C, WD	26 June 1970 (aged 32)	–	Melbourne Kestrels
Rebecca Sanders			–
Eloise Southby	GA, GS	6 July 1976 (aged 26)	1.87 m (6 ft 2 in)	Melbourne Phoenix
Peta Squire	WD, C, GD	17 January 1976 (aged 26)	1.80 m (5 ft 11 in)	Adelaide Thunderbirds

Head coach

- Jill McIntosh

Notes

- (c) – Captain
- (cc) – Co-captain
- (vc) – Vice-captain
- – Injury / maternity leave
- (TRP) – Temporary Replacement Player

=== Barbados ===
Barbados roster
Players
Coaches

Name	Pos	DOB	Height	Club	Nat	Caps
Denese Alleyne	GA, GS	24 June 1976 (aged 26)	1.78 m (5 ft 10 in)
Latonia Blackman	WD, GD, GK	6 October 1982 (aged 19)	1.77 m (5 ft 10 in)
Laurel Browne	GS, GK	2 August 1976 (aged 25)	1.89 m (6 ft 2 in)
Stacy Forde			–
Linda Harris			–
Rhonda Harris			–
Sherry Ann Martindale			–
Dionne Quareless			–
Don Small			–
Cheryl Squires	GS, GA		–
Olivia Walcott	GS, GA		–
Linda Wilson			–

Head coach

- ??

Notes

- (c) – Captain
- (cc) – Co-captain
- (vc) – Vice-captain
- – Injury / maternity leave
- (TRP) – Temporary Replacement Player

=== Fiji ===
Fiji roster
Players
Coaches

Name	Pos	DOB	Height	Club	Nat	Caps
Maria Bereso	GS, GA	15 August 1983 (aged 18)	1.80 m (5 ft 11 in)
Seforosa Munivai			–
Bulou Rambuka			–
Mere Rambuka	GK, GD	28 May 1982 (aged 20)	1.82 m (6 ft 0 in)
Bernadette Ramafono	WA		–
Taraima Rara	GS, GA	19 August 1982 (aged 19)	1.86 m (6 ft 1 in)
Anasimeci Ratumaisala	GD, GK	14 April 1975 (aged 27)	1.74 m (5 ft 9 in)
Unaisi Rokoura (c)	C, WA	7 December 1977 (aged 24)	1.63 m (5 ft 4 in)
Matelita Shaw	GS, GA	16 October 1979 (aged 22)	1.79 m (5 ft 10 in)
Paulini Tora	GS, GA		–
Lanieta Tuisese	GS, GA		–
Matila Waqanidrola	GD, GK	31 March 1981 (aged 21)	1.82 m (6 ft 0 in)

Head coach

- Margaret Corbett

Assistant coach

- Yvonne Willering

Notes

- (c) – Captain
- (cc) – Co-captain
- (vc) – Vice-captain
- – Injury / maternity leave
- (TRP) – Temporary Replacement Player

=== Jamaica ===
Jamaica roster
Players
Coaches

Name	Pos	DOB	Height	Club	Nat	Caps
Nadine Bryan	C, WA	18 December 1976 (aged 25)	1.65 m (5 ft 5 in)
Elaine Davis	GS, GK	21 September 1976 (aged 25)	1.90 m (6 ft 3 in)
Nadine Ffrench			–
Simone Forbes	GS, GA	20 June 1981 (aged 21)	1.73 m (5 ft 8 in)
Nichala Gibson	WD, GD	20 October 1982 (aged 19)	1.72 m (5 ft 8 in)
Georgia Gordon			–
Kaydia Kentish			–
Tasha Morgan			–
Oberon Pitterson (c)	GK, GD, WD	8 February 1971 (aged 31)	1.80 m (5 ft 11 in)
Sharmalee Watkins			–
Sharon Wiles			–
Tiffannie Wolfe			–

Head coach

- Maureen Hall

Notes

- (c) – Captain
- (cc) – Co-captain
- (vc) – Vice-captain
- – Injury / maternity leave
- (TRP) – Temporary Replacement Player

=== South Africa ===
South Africa roster
Players
Coaches

Name	Pos	DOB	Height	Club	Nat	Caps
Bronwyn Bock-Jonathan (cc)			–
Sindisiwe Gumede	GS, GA	10 March 1980 (aged 22)	1.73 m (5 ft 8 in)
Wanda Geldenhuis			–
Adele Jonker			–
Martha Machoga			–
Martha Mosoahle	WA	2 June 1979 (aged 23)	1.69 m (5 ft 7 in)
Nomthandazo Ntlama			–
Tanya Pelcher			–
Alicia Senekal			–
Mable Van Der Vyver (cc)			–
Shani Welthagen			–
Liezel Wium			–

Head coach

- Louise de Plessis

Notes

- (c) – Captain
- (cc) – Co-captain
- (vc) – Vice-captain
- – Injury / maternity leave
- (TRP) – Temporary Replacement Player
