= Te Huinga Reo Selby-Rickit =

New Zealand netball international

Personal information
- Born: 3 April 1989 (age 37) Hamilton, New Zealand
- Height: 1.84 m (6 ft 0 in)
- Relatives: Hud Rickit (father); Te Paea Selby-Rickit (sister); Manaaki Selby-Rickit (brother)
- School: Verdon College

Netball career
- Playing positions: GD, GK
| Years | Club team | Apps |
| 2005 | Western Flyers | |
| 2006–2007 | Southern Sting | |
| 2008–2011 | Southern Steel | 40 |
| 2012–2015 | Central Pulse | |
| 2016– | Southern Steel | |
| 2018 | → Manchester Thunder | |
| Years | National team | Caps |
| 2013 | New Zealand | 2 |
Medal record
Representing New Zealand
Fast5 Netball World Series
| Gold medal – first place | 2010 Liverpool | Team |
| Gold medal – first place | 2012 Auckland | Team |
| Gold medal – first place | 2013 Auckland | Team |
World Youth Netball Championships
| Gold medal – first place | 2005 Fort Lauderdale | Team |

Te Huinga Reo Selby-Rickit is a former New Zealand netball international. She was a member of the New Zealand teams that won the 2010, 2012 and 2013 Fast5 Netball World Series'. During the National Bank Cup era, she played for Western Flyers and Southern Sting. During the ANZ Championship era she played for Southern Steel and Central Pulse. During the ANZ Premiership era, she has played for Steel. She was a member of three premiership winning teams – the 2007 Southern Sting team and the 2017 and 2018 Southern Steel teams. She was also a member of the Steel team that won the 2017 Netball New Zealand Super Club tournament. In 2022, she was included on a list of the 25 best players to feature in netball leagues in New Zealand since 1998. Her younger sister, Te Paea Selby-Rickit, is also a New Zealand netball international. Her father, Hud Rickit, is a former New Zealand rugby union international.

== Early life, family and education ==
Selby-Rickit is a Māori with Ngāti Raukawa, Ngāti Tūwharetoa and Ngāti Porou affiliations. She was born in Hamilton and raised in Ōtaki. She is the daughter of Mereana Selby and Hud Rickit. Her mother is the CEO at Te Wānanga o Raukawa. Her father is a former New Zealand rugby union international. She has four siblings. Her younger sister, Te Paea Selby-Rickit, is also a New Zealand netball international. They were teammates at Southern Steel. A third sister, Miriama, also played netball at National Provincial Championship level. Her brothers, Manaaki Selby-Rickit and Ngarongo Selby-Rickit, are both rugby union players. The five siblings were all educated at kura kaupapa and were raised speaking te reo Māori. At 16, Te Huinga moved to Invercargill to attend Verdon College and play for Southern Sting. Robyn Broughton was both her teacher and netball coach at Verdon and her head coach at Sting. While playing at Verdon, she featured in the 2006 and 2007 netball national secondary schools finals.

== Playing career ==
=== Western Flyers ===
Selby-Rickit made her senior debut with Western Flyers, aged just 15, during the 2005 National Bank Cup season.

=== Southern Sting ===
Between 2006 and 2007, Selby-Rickit played for Southern Sting in the National Bank Cup league. During her time with Sting, as well as being coached by Robyn Broughton, Selby-Rickit played alongside Donna Wilkins and Adine Wilson.

=== Southern Steel (2008–2011) ===
Between 2008 and 2011, Selby-Rickit made 40 senior appearances for Southern Steel in the ANZ Championship. She was a member of the inaugural Southern Steel squad. During this era, Steel were coached by Selby-Rickit's mentor, Robyn Broughton. For the 2011 season, she was joined in the Steel team by her younger sister, Te Paea Selby-Rickit.

=== Central Pulse ===
Between 2012 and 2015, Selby-Rickit played for Central Pulse in the ANZ Championship. She followed Robyn Broughton from Steel to Pulse. Selby-Rickit was playing for Pulse when she was first called up for the senior New Zealand team and went onto made her senior debut.

=== Southern Steel ===
Since 2016, Selby-Rickit has played for Southern Steel, initially in the ANZ Championship and later in the ANZ Premiership. Together with her sister, Te Paea Selby-Rickit, she was a member of the Steel teams that won the 2017 and 2018 ANZ Premierships and the 2017 Netball New Zealand Super Club tournament. In 2019 and 2020, alongside Gina Crampton, Selby-Rickit served as Steel co-captain. During the 2019 season, Selby-Rickit made her 150th senior league appearance and her 100th appearance for Steel. In April 2022, Selby-Rickit was included on a list of the 25 best players to feature in netball leagues in New Zealand since 1998. Ahead of the 2023 season, Selby-Rickit was again named Steel captain. On 11 March 2023, during a Round 2 match against Central Pulse, Selby-Rickit made her 200th senior league appearance. After Leana de Bruin, Laura Langman, Liana Leota and Katrina Rore, she became just the fifth New Zealand netball player to reach this milestone. She was the first one to reach it exclusively with New Zealand franchises.

=== Manchester Thunder ===
In 2018, while travelling around Europe, Selby-Rickit guested for Manchester Thunder in the British Fast5 Netball All-Stars Championship. Her former Southern Steel team-mate, Liana Leota, who was then playing for Thunder, got her involved as an import after seeing Selby-Rickit was in Europe.

=== New Zealand ===
In 2004, aged 15, Selby-Rickit was included in the New Zealand under-21 squad. She was subsequently a member of the under-21 team that won the 2005 World Youth Netball Championships. She was selected for the New Zealand team that played at the 2010 World Netball Series. She was a member of the New Zealand team that won the 2012 Fast5 Netball World Series. In 2013 Selby-Rickit, made two appearances for the senior New Zealand team. She was called up for the 2013 Constellation Cup, but was dropped from the squad when Waimarama Taumaunu opted to include more midcourters. However she was then recalled as a replacement for the injured Leana de Bruin. On 24 October 2013, Selby-Rickit eventually made her senior debut against Malawi, in a 70–32 win during the opening test of the 2013 Taini Jamison Trophy Series. She made her second appearance during the third test of the same series. In 2016 when Te Paea Selby-Rickit was also called up for New Zealand, the Selby-Rickit sisters became only the second set of sisters, after Maxine Blomquist and Annette Heffernan, to play for New Zealand.

| Tournaments | Place |
|---|---|
| 2005 World Youth Netball Championships | 1st place, gold medalist(s) |
| 2010 World Netball Series | 1st place, gold medalist(s) |
| 2012 Fast5 Netball World Series | 1st place, gold medalist(s) |
| 2013 Constellation Cup | 2nd |
| 2013 Taini Jamison Trophy Series | 1st |
| 2013 Fast5 Netball World Series | 1st place, gold medalist(s) |

== Statistics ==
=== ANZ Premiership ===
| Season | Team | G/A | GA | RB | CPR | FD | IC | DF | PN | TO | MP |
|---|---|---|---|---|---|---|---|---|---|---|---|
| 2017 | Steel | 0/0 | ? | 20 | 33 | ? | 23 | 33 | 124 | 7 | 16 |
| 2018 | Steel | 0/0 | ? | 22 | 62 | ? | 24 | 63 | 178 | 13 | 17 |
| 2019 | Steel | 0/0 | 0 | 37 | 22 | 0 | 32 | 39 | 113 | 8 | 16 |
| 2020 | Steel | 0/0 | 1 | 18 | 42 | 2 | 13 | 31 | 106 | 6 | 14 |
| 2021 | Steel | 0/0 | ? | 10 | 59 | 0 | 11 | 32 | 145 | 5 | 16 |
| 2022 | Steel | 0/0 | 0 | 7 | 12 | 0 | 10 | 46 | 88 | 6 | 13 |
| 2023 | Steel | 0/0 | ? | 3 | 41 | 1 | 8 | 26 | 108 | 10 | 14 |
| Career | | | | | | | | | | | |

Notes

- ^1 Selby-Rickit made 8 National Bank Cup appearances with Western Flyers and Southern Sting and 99 ANZ Championship appearances with Southern Steel and Central Pulse.

== Basketball ==
In October 2022, Selby-Rickit played for Southland Storm in the Schick Cup, a 3x3 basketball tournament played at the ILT Stadium Southland. She has also played in Southland Basketball leagues.

== Coaching career ==
At the start of the 2024 ANZ Premiership season, Selby-Rickit was appointed assistant coach of Mainland Tactix alongside Marianne Delaney-Hoshek.

== Honours ==
New Zealand

- Taini Jamison Trophy
  - Winners: 2013
- Fast5 Netball World Series
  - Winners: 2010, 2012, 2013
- World Youth Netball Championships
  - Winners: 2005

Southern Steel

- ANZ Premiership
  - Winners: 2017, 2018
- ANZ Championship
  - Minor premiers: 2016
- Netball New Zealand Super Club
  - Winners: 2017

Southern Sting

- National Bank Cup
  - Winners: 2007
  - Runners Up: 2006
