= Donna Wilkins =

New Zealand netball and basketball player

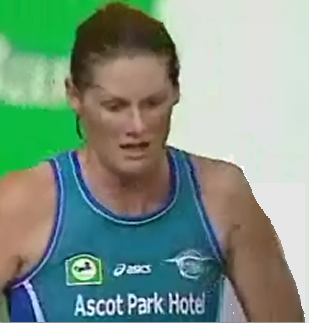

Personal information
- Full name: Donna Wilkins (née Loffhagen)
- Born: Donna Loffhagen; 29 April 1978 (age 48) Christchurch, New Zealand
- Height: 1.85 m (6 ft 1 in)
- Spouse: Mike Wilkins (m. 2007)
- Children: 2 sons 1 daughter

Netball career
- Playing positions: GS, GA
| Years | Club team | Apps |
| 1998–2007 | Southern Sting | |
| 2011 | Mainland Tactix | |
| 2008-2009, 2012 | Southern Steel | |
| 2013–2014 | Central Pulse | |
| Years | National team | Caps |
| 1996–2002 | Silver Ferns | 56 |
Medal record
Representing New Zealand
Netball World Championships
| Silver medal – second place | 1999 Christchurch | Netball |
Commonwealth Games
| Silver medal – second place | 1998 Kuala Lumpur | Netball |
| Silver medal – second place | 2002 Manchester | Netball |

Donna Wilkins (née Loffhagen; born 29 April 1978 in Christchurch, New Zealand) is a former New Zealand representative in netball and basketball. She married Southland farmer Mike Wilkins on 16 March 2007. Wilkins returned to the Southern Steel for the 2012 season, after a short stint with the Canterbury Tactix in 2011.

== Netball ==
Wilkins has represented the New Zealand Silver Ferns 56 times, making her 50th cap against Barbados in Auckland, New Zealand. The 1.85 cm, Goal Attack and Goal Shoot, started her career for Canterbury in the National Championships in 1994 as a cool sixteen-year-old. She carried on playing for the province until called into the Silver Ferns in 1996. After four years playing top netball in Canterbury, Donna Wilkins signed with the Southland netball team for the 1997 season along with fellow Silver Ferns captain Bernice Mene. She shot the southerners into fourth place overall in the championships, a much improved performance of 10th the year before.

After Netball New Zealand announced plans for a new semi-professional franchise competition for 1998 season to replace the old provincial champs, the new Invercargill based franchise the Southern Sting retained Wilkins services along with Bernice Mene for the season.

During the season Wilkins had scored 38 out of 51 goals against Otago Rebels but eventually lost the championship 57 to 51.

She continued to play in the South for the Southern Sting till 2006, when she was called into the Suns basketball team in the American WNBA basketball competition. She returned for the Stings semi final and final game during which she led them to win the semi-final game 64–41 against the Northern Force along with the final winning over Waikato Bay of Plenty Magic in the 2007 National Bank Cup with a score of 48–46.

The Sting won seven out of the ten National Bank Cup titles, being named as one of the world's best sporting teams. Other big names to play for the franchise include: Bernice Mene, Tania Dalton, Megan Hutton, Belinda Colling, Leana de Bruin, Liana Leota, Adine Wilson, Lesley Rumball, Naomi Siddall, Wendy Frew, Erika Burgess, Daneka Wipiiti and Natalie Avellino.

In 2008 a new trans-Tasman semi-professional league was launched, the ANZ Championship. Wilkins did not play in the first season due to pregnancy, but continued with the Southern Steel as an assistant coach. She returned to the playing lineup for the 2009 season, where the Steel improved on their 2008 standing to reach the finals stage; the Steel were eventually defeated by the Adelaide Thunderbirds in the semi-finals. Later that month, Wilkins announced that she would not be returning to the Steel in 2010.

Wilkins turned out for the Canterbury Tactix in 2011, and for the next season returned to Southern Steel which she did with family help.

As a member of the New Zealand national netball team, Loffhagen won two Commonwealth Games silver medals, at Kuala Lumpur in 1998 and Manchester in 2002.

== Basketball ==
Wilkins formerly played for Canterbury in the NZ Women's Basketball League. In Australia, she played three seasons in the WNBL. In the 2004–05 WNBL season, she played for the Canberra Capitals and was the league's leading rebounder. In 2006, she signed for the Connecticut Suns in the US WNBA and was waived after a six-week trial. After being cut by the Suns, she returned for her second season with the Canberra Capitals in the 2006–07 WNBL season, and played a key role in helping Canberra win the 2007 WNBL Grand Final. After playing with the Canberra Capitals, she ended her basketball career playing in 2007–08 on the Christchurch Sirens for their only season in the WNBL. Wilkins earned a Most Valuable Player award in the Sirens' first WNBL win, a 76–55 victory against Dandenong Rangers.

As of 2006, Wilkins had 95 caps for the Tall Ferns, the New Zealand women's national basketball team, including the 2000 Summer Olympics in Sydney, the 2004 Summer Olympics in Athens (where she was the tournament's leading rebounder with 10.6 rebounds per game), and the 2006 Commonwealth Games in Melbourne (where she captained the Tall Ferns to a silver medal behind gold medalists Australia).

== Coaching ==
Wilkins began coaching the Southern Steel in 2008 when she was pregnant with her first child, this was under her own previous coach Robyn Broughton. Wilkins was announced as the Mainland Tactix coach for the 2025 ANZ Premiership season, having worked with the team in previous seasons and coached them to their first ever title win in 28 years.
