= Belinda Colling =

New Zealand netball and basketball international

Personal information
- Full name: Belinda Louise Colling
- Born: 12 September 1975 (age 51) Cromwell, New Zealand
- Height: 1.78 m (5 ft 10 in)
- Spouse: Charlie Hore
- Relatives: Lin Colling (uncle); Andrew Hore (brother-in-law)
- School: Logan Park High School

Netball career
- Playing positions: GA, GS, WA
Years	Club team	Apps
1998–2000	Otago Rebels	
2001–2004	Canterbury Flames	
2005–2006	Team Northumbria	
2006	Southern Sting	
Years	National team	Caps
1996–2006	New Zealand	92
Medal record
Representing New Zealand
World Netball Championships
Gold medal – first place	2003 Kingston	Team
Silver medal – second place	1999 Christchurch	Team
Commonwealth Games
Gold medal – first place	2006 Melbourne	Team
Silver medal – second place	2002 Manchester	Team
Silver medal – second place	1998 Kuala Lumpur	Team

Belinda Louise Colling (born 12 September 1975) is a former New Zealand netball international. Between 1996 and 2006, she made 92 senior appearances for New Zealand. She captained New Zealand at the 1998 Commonwealth Games and the 1999 World Netball Championships and was a member of the New Zealand teams that won gold medals at the 2003 World Netball Championships and the 2006 Commonwealth Games. Colling is also a double international and played for the New Zealand women's national basketball team at the 2000 Summer Olympics. During the Coca-Cola Cup/National Bank Cup era, Colling played netball for Otago Rebels, Canterbury Flames and Southern Sting. She also played for Team Northumbria in the Netball Superleague. In 2022, she was included on a list of the 25 best players to feature in netball leagues in New Zealand since 1998.

== Early life, family and education ==
Colling is a member of a prominent Otago rugby union family. She is the daughter of Don Colling who, between 1968 and 1977 played 80 games for Otago. As well as her father, her two uncles, two brothers, her husband, Charlie Hore, and his brother, Andrew Hore, all played for Otago. Her uncle, Lin Colling and Andrew Hore, were also New Zealand rugby union internationals. Colling met Charlie Hore in the late 1990s while playing for Otago Rebels. At the time he was playing rugby union for Otago. Together they have four children together.

== Netball career ==
=== Otago Rebels ===
Between 1998 and 2000, Colling played for Otago Rebels in the Coca-Cola Cup. In 1998, Colling was a member of the Rebels team that won the inaugural Coca-Cola Cup title. In the final they defeated Southern Sting 57–50, with Colling scoring 10 from 18. In 1999, she again helped Rebels reach the final. However, this time they lost 63–54 to Sting.

=== Canterbury Flames ===
Between 2001 and 2004, Colling played for Canterbury Flames in the Coca-Cola Cup/National Bank Cup. During this time, she captained Flames as they played in three grand finals. In the 2002 final, she carried on playing despite receiving a black eye.

=== Team Northumbria ===
In August 2004, Colling moved to Scotland with her then partner, Charlie Hore, after he signed a two-year contract to play for Borders. She subsequently worked as a netball coach at Team Northumbria, coaching both their university and Super Cup teams. She also played for Team Northumbria during 2005–06 Netball Superleague season. While playing for Team Northumbria, she was selected to play for New Zealand at 2006 Commonwealth Games.

=== Southern Sting ===
In 2006, Colling played for Southern Sting in the National Bank Cup, helping them reach the grand final. In 2007, she served as Robyn Broughton's assistant coach at Sting. Ahead of the 2008 season, she initially declared an interest in playing for Sting's successor team, Southern Steel, but eventually announced her retirement. On 23 July 2018, Colling, together with Donna Wilkins, Bernice Mene and Natalie Avellino, played for Sting in a charity match against Netball South of the National Netball League. The match marked Sting's 20th anniversary.

=== New Zealand ===
Between 1996 and 2006, Colling made 92 senior appearances for New Zealand. On 25 May 1996, she made her senior debut for New Zealand against South Africa. Between 1997 and 1999, she captained New Zealand, including at the 1998 Commonwealth Games and the 1999 World Netball Championships. She was also a member of the New Zealand teams that won gold medals at the 2003 World Netball Championships and the 2006 Commonwealth Games. In 2009–10, during the Ruth Aitken era, she served as a shooting coach with New Zealand. In April 2022, she was one of 25 New Zealand internationals included on a list of the best players to feature in netball leagues in New Zealand since 1998.

Tournaments	Place
1998 Commonwealth Games	2nd place, silver medalist(s)
1999 World Netball Championships	2nd place, silver medalist(s)
2002 Commonwealth Games	2nd place, silver medalist(s)
2003 World Netball Championships	1st place, gold medalist(s)
2006 Commonwealth Games	1st place, gold medalist(s)

== Basketball career ==
Between 1996 and 2006, Colling played for the New Zealand women's national basketball team. She represented New Zealand at the 2000 Summer Olympics. Her team mates included Donna Loffhagen, who was also a New Zealand netball international. Colling was also considered for 2004 Summer Olympics. However she opted to concentrate on netball.

== Later career ==
=== Commentator ===
Colling has worked as a netball commentator and presenter for Sky Sport (New Zealand). During the ANZ Championship era, she worked alongside Anna Stanley, Tania Dalton, Temepara Bailey and Adine Wilson. In the ANZ Premiership era, she has worked with Jodi Brown and Jordan Vandermade.

== Honours ==
New Zealand

- World Netball Championships
  - Winners: 2003
  - Runners Up: 1999
- Commonwealth Games
  - Winners: 2006
  - Runners Up: 1998, 2002

Otago Rebels

- Coca-Cola Cup
  - Winners: 1998
  - Runners Up: 1999

Canterbury Flames

- Coca-Cola Cup/National Bank Cup
  - Runners Up: 2001, 2002, 2004

Southern Sting

- National Bank Cup
  - Runners Up: 2006
