= Lesley Nicol =

Lesley Nicol may refer to:

- Lesley Rumball (born 1973), former New Zealand netball player; born Lesley Marie Nicol
- Lesley Nicol (actress) (born 1953), English actress
