= Adine Wilson =

New Zealand netball international

Adine Wilson MNZM
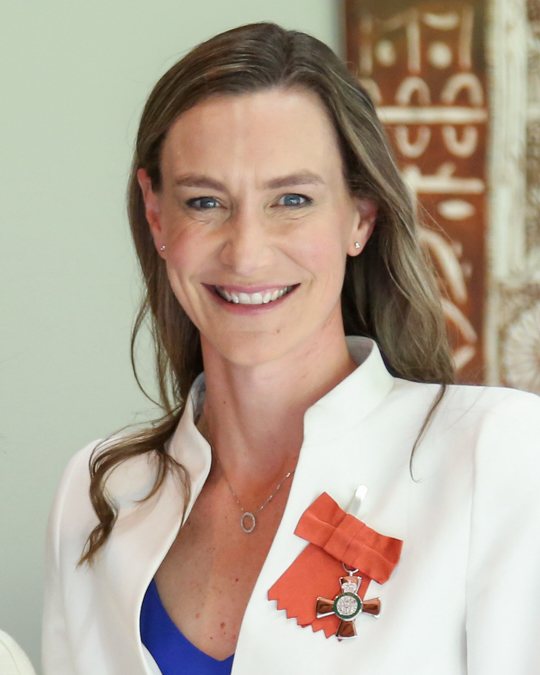
- Wilson in 2024

Personal information
- Full name: Adine Rachel Wilson (Née: Harper)
- Born: 8 June 1979 (age 47) Hāwera, New Zealand
- Height: 1.80 m (5 ft 11 in)
- Spouse: Jeff Wilson (m. 2006)
- Children: 2
- School: Hawera High School
- University: University of Otago

Netball career
- Playing positions: WA, C, GA, GS
Years	Club team	Apps
1998–2000	Otago Rebels	
2001–2007	Southern Sting	
2009, 2012	Southern Steel	
Years	National team	Caps
1999–2007	New Zealand	79
Medal record
Representing New Zealand
Commonwealth Games
Gold medal – first place	2006 Melbourne	Team
World Netball Championships
Gold medal – first place	2003 Kingston	Team
Silver medal – second place	1999 Christchurch	Team
Silver medal – second place	2007 Auckland	Team
World Youth Netball Championships
Silver medal – second place	1996 Toronto	Team
Bronze medal – third place	2000 Cardiff	Team

Adine Rachel Wilson MNZM (née Harper; born 8 June 1979) is a former New Zealand netball international and current commentator. Between 1999 and 2007, Wilson made 79 senior appearances for New Zealand. She represented New Zealand at the 1999 and the 2003 World Netball Championships, winning a gold medal at the latter. She captained New Zealand when they won gold at the 2006 Commonwealth Games and again at the 2007 World Netball Championships. During the Coca-Cola Cup/National Bank Cup era, she played for Otago Rebels and Southern Sting. During the early ANZ Championship era, she captained Southern Steel. She was a member of six premiership winning teams – the 1998 Otago Rebels team and the 2001, 2002, 2003, 2004 and 2007 Southern Sting teams. In 2022, she was included on a list of the 25 best players to feature in netball leagues in New Zealand since 1998. In 2024, Wilson was appointed a Member of the New Zealand Order of Merit, for services to netball.

== Early life, family and education ==
Wilson was born Adine Rachel Harper, the daughter of Annette and Peter Harper. She has an older sister, Leah. Her father played representative rugby union for Taranaki while her mother and sister played netball. She was born and raised in Hāwera, Taranaki where she attended Hawera High School. She subsequently studied at the University of Otago where she gained a Bachelor of Laws and a Bachelor of Physical Education. She is married to Jeff Wilson, a dual international who represented New Zealand at both rugby union and cricket. They met in 1999 and married in 2006. They have two sons.

== Playing career ==
=== Taranaki ===
As a schoolgirl, Harper represented Taranaki at various under age groups. While still attending Hawera High School, she was selected to play for the Taranaki senior women's team. She subsequently represented Taranaki at the National Championships in Christchurch. At the end of the tournament, she was selected to play for the New Zealand under-21 team.

=== Otago Rebels ===
Between 1998 and 2000, while studying at the University of Otago, Harper played for Otago Rebels in the Coca-Cola Cup league. Together with Lesley Nicol, Belinda Blair, Belinda Colling, Victoria Edward, Anna Rowberry and Jo Steed, Harper was a member of the Rebels team that finished the inaugural 1998 season as champions.

=== Southern Sting ===
Between 2001 and 2007, Wilson played for Southern Sting in the Coca-Cola Cup/National Bank Cup league. While playing for Sting, she a member of five premiership winning teams, helping them win titles in 2001, 2002, 2003, 2004 and 2007. Her team mates at Sting included Donna Loffhagen, Bernice Mene, Belinda Colling, Tania Dalton and Lesley Nicol. Wilson captained Sting during the 2006 season. In April 2022, she was included on a list of the 25 best players to feature in netball leagues in New Zealand since 1998.

=== Southern Steel ===
Wilson missed the inaugural 2008 ANZ Championship season with Southern Steel because of pregnancy. In 2009, she returned and was named Steel captain. However she struggled with a calf injury and also became pregnant for a second time. In 2012, Wilson made a cameo appearance for Steel as a temporary replacement player during the final quarter of a Round 11 against Northern Mystics.

=== New Zealand ===
Between 1999 and 2007, Wilson made 79 senior appearances for New Zealand. On 19 June 1999, she made her senior debut for New Zealand against South Africa as a goal shooter. While still attending Hawera High School, she had previously represented New Zealand at the 1996 World Youth Netball Championships. She subsequently represented New Zealand at the 1999 World Netball Championships. Harper captained the New Zealand under-21 team that were bronze medalists at the 2000 World Youth Netball Championships. She was a member of the New Zealand team that won the 2003 World Netball Championships.

Between 2005 and 2007, Wilson served as captain of New Zealand. She captained New Zealand when they won the gold at 2006 Commonwealth Games. In the final New Zealand won the Commonwealth title for the first time with a 60–55 win over Australia. She also captained New Zealand at the 2007 World Netball Championships.

Tournaments	Place
1996 World Youth Netball Championships	2nd place, silver medalist(s)
1999 World Netball Championships	2nd place, silver medalist(s)
2000 World Youth Netball Championships	3rd place, bronze medalist(s)
2003 World Netball Championships	1st place, gold medalist(s)
2006 Commonwealth Games	1st place, gold medalist(s)
2007 World Netball Championships	2nd place, silver medalist(s)

== Later career ==
=== Lawyer ===
Wilson was admitted to the bar in 2003. Between 2003 and 2004 she worked as a solicitor for Anderson Lloyd. Between 2015 and 2021, Wilson worked as a solicitor for Auckland firm Cook Morris Quinn, specialising in trusts, property agreements and commercial contracts. Since 2023 she has worked as an associate with Meredith Connell's sports law department.

=== Writer ===
In 2008, Hodder Moa published Adine Wilson: Skills and Performance. The book is part biographical, part instructional. The publisher approached Wilson and told her there were no netball books out there and retailers were asking for them. The book was written with Ron Palenski.

=== Commentator ===
Since 2013, Wilson has worked as a netball commentator and presenter for Sky Sport (New Zealand). She has worked on their coverage of ANZ Championship, ANZ Premiership and New Zealand matches. For the 2019 Netball World Cup she co–hosted Sky Sport's coverage with Jordan Vandermade with a panel featuring Anna Stanley, Jodi Brown and Anna Harrison.

== Personal life ==
In 2016, Wilson married former All Black and Black Cap, Jeff Wilson.

In December 2016, Wilson fell down a ladder at her family bach at Mangawhai Heads, breaking her neck in two places and requiring major spinal surgery. She revealed on Game On that the spinal surgery left her losing weight, especially muscle mass, which also negatively affects her vertical jump. While at the height of her netball career, Wilson was diagnosed with melanoma which was removed at an early stage. She blames striving to get a tan so she didn't look pasty white in her netball dress for the cancer scare and is a strong advocate for Melanoma New Zealand.

== Honours ==
New Zealand

- World Netball Championships
  - Winners: 2003
  - Runners Up: 1999, 2007
- Commonwealth Games
  - Winners: 2006

Southern Sting

- Coca-Cola Cup/National Bank Cup
  - Winners: 2001, 2002, 2003, 2004, 2007
  - Runners Up: 2005, 2006

Otago Rebels

- Coca-Cola Cup
  - Winners: 1998
  - Runners Up: 1999

Individual Awards

Year	Award
2024	New Zealand Order of Merit
