= 2017 Southern Steel season =

Southern Steel season

Southern Steel
- 2017 season
- Head coach: Reinga Bloxham
- Asst. coach: Lauren Piebenga
- Manager: Dayna Kaio
- Captain: Wendy Frew
- Main venue: Stadium Southland

Season results
- Wins–losses: 21–0
- Regular season: 1st
- Finals placing: ANZ Premiership winners Super Club winners
- Team colours

Southern Steel seasons
- ← 2016 2018 →

The 2017 Southern Steel season saw the Southern Steel netball team compete in the 2017 ANZ Premiership and the 2017 Netball New Zealand Super Club. With a team coached by Reinga Bloxham, captained by Wendy Frew and featuring Gina Crampton, Jhaniele Fowler-Reid, Shannon Francois, and Jane Watson, Steel finished the 2017 season as inaugural ANZ Premiership winners. After finishing the regular season unbeaten and as minor premiers, Steel defeated Central Pulse 69–53 in the grand final. This saw Steel complete a 16 match unbeaten ANZ Premiership season. Steel remained unbeaten as they went onto win the inaugural Netball New Zealand Super Club tournament, defeating Northern Mystics 79–58 in the final. This saw Steel finish the season with 21 wins and zero defeats.

== Players ==
=== Player movements ===
Gains and losses
▲ Gains	▼ Losses
Olivia Bates (Netball South); Aliyah Dunn (Netball South); Dani Gray (Netball South); Jennifer O'Connell (Netball South)	Brooke Leaver (Mainland Tactix); Stacey Peeters (Celtic Dragons); Storm Purvis (Northern Mystics)

=== 2017 roster ===
2017 Southern Steel roster
Players
Coaching staff

Nat.	Name	Position(s)	DoB	Height
(New Zealand)	Olivia Bates (TRP)	GA, WA	20 March 1991 (aged 26)	1.73 m (5 ft 8 in)
(New Zealand)	Gina Crampton	WA, C	7 December 1991 (aged 25)	1.74 m (5 ft 9 in)
(New Zealand)	Aliyah Dunn (TRP)	GS	19 October 1999 (aged 17)	1.90 m (6 ft 3 in)
(New Zealand)	Abby Erwood	GA, C, WA	18 April 1997 (aged 19)	1.83 m (6 ft 0 in)
(Jamaica)	Jhaniele Fowler-Reid	GS	21 July 1989 (aged 27)	1.96 m (6 ft 5 in)
(New Zealand)	Shannon Francois (vc)	WA, C, GA	12 October 1990 (aged 26)	1.76 m (5 ft 9 in)
(New Zealand)	Wendy Frew (c)	WD, C, WA	15 October 1984 (aged 32)	1.74 m (5 ft 9 in)
(New Zealand)	Dani Gray (TRP)	WD, C	3 November 1995 (aged 21)	1.80 m (5 ft 11 in)
(New Zealand)	Jamie Hume	GA, GS	22 March 1996 (aged 21)	1.82 m (6 ft 0 in)
(New Zealand)	Jennifer O'Connell	GS	16 June 1997 (aged 19)	1.93 m (6 ft 4 in)
(New Zealand)	Te Huinga Reo Selby-Rickit	GK, GD	3 April 1989 (aged 27)	1.84 m (6 ft 0 in)
(New Zealand)	Te Paea Selby-Rickit	GS, GA	14 January 1992 (aged 25)	1.93 m (6 ft 4 in)
(New Zealand)	Jane Watson	GK, GD, WD	7 March 1990 (aged 27)	1.81 m (5 ft 11 in)

Head coach

- (New Zealand) Reinga Bloxham

Assistant coach

- Lauren Piebenga

Manager: Dayna Kaio
Physiotherapist:
Corina Ngatuere
Strength and conditioning:
Mike Jacob

Notes

- (c) – Captain
- (cc) – Co-captain
- (vc) – Vice-captain
- – Injury / maternity leave
- (TRP) – Temporary Replacement Player

== Pre-season ==
Ahead of the 2017 season, Steel appointed Reinga Bloxham as their new head coach. During the pre-season, Steel played three series of two matches against Noeline Taurua's Sunshine Coast Lightning, Mainland Tactix and their own National Netball League team, Netball South. They also played three matches at the official ANZ Premiership pre-season tournament at Te Wānanga o Raukawa in Ōtaki.

10 February 2017	Sunshine Coast Lightning	75–44	Southern Steel	USC Stadium
		Report

12 February 2017	Sunshine Coast Lightning	56–44	Southern Steel	USC Stadium

26 February 2017	Southern Steel	77–39	Netball South	Oamaru
		Report

4 March 2017	Southern Steel	79-51	Mainland Tactix	Edgar Centre

5 March 2017	Southern Steel	74–48	Mainland Tactix	Edgar Centre

10 March 2017	Southern Steel	74–64	Waikato Bay of Plenty Magic	Te Wānanga o Raukawa
	Jhaniele Fowler-Reid 38/40 (95%); Te Paea Selby-Rickit 20/27 (74%); Jennifer O'Connell 9/12 (75%); Jamie Hume 7/8 (88%)	Report; Stats	Lenize Potgieter 42/44 (95%); Monica Falkner 19/25 (76%); Grace Rasmussen 3/4 (75%)

11 March 2017	Central Pulse	48–53	Southern Steel	Te Wānanga o Raukawa
	Tiana Metuarau 26/30 (87%); Te Amo Amaru-Tibble 21/24 (88%); Mila Reuelu-Buchanan 1/2 (50%)	Report	Jhaniele Fowler-Reid 31/35 (89%); Te Paea Selby-Rickit 19/24 (79%); Jamie Hume 3/12 (25%)

12 March 2017	Southern Steel	70–49	Northern Mystics	Te Wānanga o Raukawa
	Jhaniele Fowler-Reid 39/44 (89%); Te Paea Selby-Rickit 20/26 (77%); Jamie Hume 11/11 (100%)	Report	Eseta Autagavaia 26/33 (79%); Renee Matoe 23/29 (79%)

19 March 2017	Southern Steel	69–42	Netball South	Stadium Southland
		Report

== ANZ Premiership regular season ==
=== Fixtures and results ===
Round 1

26 March 2017	Southern Steel	75–57	Northern Stars	Claudelands Arena
2:00 pm	Jhaniele Fowler-Reid 52/54 (96%); Jamie Hume 3/4 (75%); Te Paea Selby-Rickit 20/24 (83%)	Report; Stats	Afa Rusivakula 8/10 (80%); Malia Vaka 12/13 (92%); Maia Wilson 37/40 (93%)

Round 2

3 April 2017	Northern Mystics	67–74	Southern Steel	The Trusts Arena
7:40 pm	Bailey Mes 39/43 (91%); Maria Tutaia 28/39 (72%)	Report; Stats	Jhaniele Fowler-Reid 60–69; Te Paea Selby-Rickit 14/19 (74%)

Round 3

10 April 2017	Southern Steel	72–59	Waikato Bay of Plenty Magic	Stadium Southland
7:40 pm	Jhaniele Fowler-Reid 45/50 (90%); Jamie Hume 7/9 (78%); Te Paea Selby-Rickit 20/27 (74%)	Report; Stats	Monica Falkner 19/21 (90%); Lenize Potgieter 38/41 (93%); Grace Rasmussen 2/4 (50%)

Round 4

19 April 2017	Mainland Tactix	41–90	Southern Steel	Horncastle Arena
7:40 pm	Kadeen Corbin 6/10 (60%); Brooke Leaver 28/32 (88%); Anna Thompson 7/8 (88%)	Report; Stats	Jhaniele Fowler-Reid 70/75 (93%); Jamie Hume 9/15 (60%); Te Paea Selby-Rickit 11/13 (85%)

Round 5

26 April 2017	Northern Stars	51–73	Southern Steel	Vodafone Events Centre
7:40 pm	Afa Rusivakula 5/6 (83%); Malia Vaka 8/16 (50%); Maia Wilson 38/42 (90%)	Report; Stats	Jhaniele Fowler-Reid 45/46 (98%); Jamie Hume 8/15 (53%); Te Paea Selby-Rickit 20/26 (77%)

Round 6

30 April 2017	Southern Steel	66–46	Northern Mystics	Stadium Southland
4:00 pm	Jhaniele Fowler-Reid 50/59 (85%); Jamie Hume 3/4 (75%); Te Paea Selby-Rickit 13/19 (68%)	Report; Stats	Tera-Maria Amani 2/4 (50%); Bailey Mes 22/27 (81%); Maria Tutaia 22/33 (67%)

1 May 2017	Southern Steel	63–50	Central Pulse	Stadium Southland
7:40 pm	Jhaniele Fowler-Reid 49/54 (91%); Te Paea Selby-Rickit 14/23 (61%)	Report; Stats	Tiana Metuarau 24/31 (77%); Cathrine Tuivaiti 26/26 (100%)

Round 7

7 May 2017	Southern Steel	61—55	Mainland Tactix	More FM Arena
2:00 pm	Jhaniele Fowler-Reid 29/31 (94%); Te Paea Selby-Rickit 16/19 (84%); Jamie Hume 16/23 (70%)	Stats	Ellie Bird 34/39 (87%); Brooke Leaver 17/25 (68%); Anna Thompson 4/5 (80%)

Round 8

14 May 2017	Waikato Bay of Plenty Magic	61—65	Southern Steel	Energy Events Centre
2:00 pm	Lenise Potgieter 46/49 (94%); Monica Falkner 12/16 (75%); Amorangi Malesala 3/3 (100%)	Report; Stats	Jhaniele Fowler-Reid 49/56 (88%); Te Paea Selby-Rickit 16/21 (76%)

Round 9

24 May 2017	Central Pulse	44—80	Southern Steel	Te Rauparaha Arena
7:40 pm	Cathrine Tuivaiti 26/28 (93%); Tiana Metuarau 11/18 (61%); Te Amo Amaru-Tibble 7/8 (88%)	Report; Stats	Jhaniele Fowler-Reid 66/70 (94%); Te Paea Selby-Rickit 14/21 (67%); Jamie Hume 0/2 (0%)

Round 10

28 May 2017	Southern Steel	82—58	Northern Stars	Stadium Southland
2:00 pm	Jhaniele Fowler-Reid 56/59 (95%); Te Paea Selby-Rickit 25/29 (86%); Jennifer O'Connell 1/3 (33%)	Report; Stats	Maia Wilson 42/46 (91%); Malia Vaka 13/19 (68%); Afa Rusivakula 3/5 (60%)

Round 11

7 June 2017	Southern Steel	68 – 67	Northern Mystics	More FM Arena
7:40 pm	Jhaniele Fowler-Reid 53/58 (91%); Te Paea Selby-Rickit 15/20 (75%)	Report; Stats	Maria Tutaia 20/27 (74%); Bailey Mes 47/50 (94%)

Round 12

11 June 2017	Southern Steel	78–59	Waikato Bay of Plenty Magic	The Trusts Arena
2:00 pm	Jhaniele Fowler-Reid 60/66 (91%); Te Paea Selby-Rickit 18/23 (78%)	Report; Stats	Lenize Potgieter 34/38 (89%); Monica Falkner 25/33 (76%)

Steel's perfect season was almost derailed on 12 June when a van with six of their players on board was involved in a road traffic accident in Fendalton, Christchurch. Four of the players were injured. Wendy Frew received over seventy stitches and underwent surgery while Te Paea Selby-Rickit suffered a dual fractured rib. Shannon Francois and Jhaniele Fowler-Reid had minor injuries. Just two days later, on 14 June, Steel notched up win number 14 of the season against Mainland Tactix. Sophie Erwood, Olivia Bates, Dani Gray and Aliyah Dunn were seconded from Steel's National Netball League team, Netball South. Despite been 41–38 down after three quarters, Steel launched a comeback in the fourth quarter to win 51–46.

14 June 2017	Mainland Tactix	46–51	Southern Steel	Horncastle Arena
6:00 pm	Ellie Bird 35/41 (85%); Brooke Leaver 11/14 (79%)	Stats	Jennifer O'Connell 38/45 (84%); Jamie Hume 8/15 (53%); Olivia Bates 4/6 (67%); Aliyah Dunn 1/2 (50%)

Round 13

19 June 2017	Southern Steel	64–51	Central Pulse	Stadium Southland
7:40 pm	Jhaniele Fowler-Reid 51/53 (96%); Jamie Hume 6/8 (75%); Olivia Bates 4/4 (100%); Jennifer O'Connell 3/6 (50%)	Report; Stats	Cathrine Tuivaiti 28/29 (97%); Tiana Metuarau 12/15 (80%); Te Amo Amaru-Tibble 11/12 (92%)

=== Final standings ===
2017 ANZ Premiership ladder
Pos	Team	P	W	L	GF	GA	GD	G%	BP	Pts
1	Southern Steel	15	15	0	1062	812	250	130.79%	0	30
2	Central Pulse	15	9	6	783	756	27	103.57%	2	20
3	Northern Mystics	15	8	7	878	851	27	111.35%	3	19
4	Waikato Bay of Plenty Magic	15	7	8	873	848	25	102.95%	5	19
5	Northern Stars	15	4	11	738	868	-130	85.02%	1	9
6	Mainland Tactix	15	2	13	676	875	-199	77.26%	2	6

Qualified for Grand final and the 2017 Netball New Zealand Super Club
Qualified for Elimination final and the 2017 Netball New Zealand Super Club

== ANZ Premiership Finals Series ==
=== Grand final ===
28 June; 7:40 pm	Stats	Southern Steel	69–53	Central Pulse	Stadium Southland	Sky Sport
28 June; 7:40 pm	Stats	Scoring by quarter: 18–10, 35–20, 55–38, 69–53			Stadium Southland	Sky Sport
28 June; 7:40 pm	Stats	Jhaniele Fowler-Reid 56/60 (93%); Te Paea Selby-Rickit 13/19 (68%)		Tiana Metuarau 27/30 (90%); Cathrine Tuivaiti 26/29 (90%)	Stadium Southland	Sky Sport

== Netball New Zealand Super Club ==
=== Group stage ===
2 July 2017	Southern Steel	81–37	Gauteng Jaguars	Trafalgar Centre
	Jhaniele Fowler-Reid 58/64 (91%); Jamie Hume 13/18 (72%); Olivia Bates 6/7 (86%); Jennifer O'Connell 4/8 (50%)	Stats	Ine-Marí Venter 21/31 (68%); Renske Stoltz 13/18 (72%); Chante Louw 4/5 (80%); Anique Grobler 1/2 (50%)

3 July 2017	Southern Steel	86–55	UTT	Trafalgar Centre
6:40pm	Jhaniele Fowler-Reid 59/64 (92%); Jamie Hume 9/14 (64%); Jennifer O'Connell 11/15 (73%); Olivia Bates 7/16 (44%)	Stats	Samantha Wallace 35/38 (92%); Kalifa McCollin 20/25 (80%)

5 July 2017	Southern Steel	77–61	NSWIS	Trafalgar Centre
	Jhaniele Fowler-Reid 68/72 (94%); Te Paea Selby-Rickit 4/5 (80%); Jamie Hume 3/7 (43%); Olivia Bates 2/2 (100%)	Report	Kristina Brice 41/47 (87%); Sophie Garbin 15/18 (83%); Georgia Marshall 5/6 (83%)

Final ladder

Group A
Pos	Team	P	W	D	L	GF	GA	Pts
1	(New Zealand) Southern Steel	3	3	0	0	244	153	6
2	(Australia) NSWIS	3	2	0	1	209	168	4
3	(Trinidad and Tobago) UTT	3	0	1	2	164	223	1
4	(South Africa) Gauteng Jaguars	3	0	1	2	145	218	1

Qualified for Semi-finals
5th/8th place classification

=== 1st/4th Play offs ===
Semi-finals

6 July 2017	Southern Steel	70–54	Central Pulse	Trafalgar Centre
6:40pm	Jhaniele Fowler-Reid 55/59 (93%); Te Paea Selby-Rickit 12/15 (80%); Olivia Bates 3/7 (43%); Jamie Hume 0/1 (0%)	Stats	Cathrine Tuivaiti 30/30 (100%); Te Amo Amaru-Tibble 24/29 (83%)

Final

7 July 2017	Stats	Southern Steel	79–58	Northern Mystics	Trafalgar Centre	Sky Sport
7 July 2017	Stats	Scoring by quarter: 17–17, 32–34, 53–46, 79–58			Trafalgar Centre	Sky Sport
7 July 2017	Stats	Jhaniele Fowler-Reid 65/70 (93%); Te Paea Selby-Rickit 12/18 (67%); Olivia Bates 2/3 (67%)		Bailey Mes 32/33 (97%); Maria Tutaia 20/27 (74%); Tera-Maria Amani 6/8 (75%)	Trafalgar Centre	Sky Sport

== Award winners ==
=== New Zealand Netball Awards ===
Award	Winner
ANZ Premiership Player of the Year	Jane Watson
