= Southern Sting =

Defunct New Zealand netball team

- Founded: 1998; 28 years ago
- Disbanded: 2007; 19 years ago
- Based in: Invercargill
- Region: Southland
- Home venue: Stadium Southland
- Head coach: Robyn Broughton
- League: Coca-Cola Cup/National Bank Cup
- Website: www.sting.co.nz
Uniform

Southern Sting are a former New Zealand netball team that were based in Invercargill. Between 1998 and 2007, Sting played in the Coca-Cola Cup/National Bank Cup league. They were the league's most successful team. They played in all ten grand finals and won seven of the ten titles played for. Between 1999 and 2004, Sting won six successive titles. Ahead of the 2008 season, Sting merged with Otago Rebels to form the new ANZ Championship team, Southern Steel.

== History ==
=== Inaugural season ===
In 1998, together with Auckland Diamonds, Bay of Plenty Magic, Capital Shakers, Canterbury Flames, Counties Manukau Cometz, Northern Force, Otago Rebels, Waikato Wildcats and Western Flyers, Sting were founding members of the Coca-Cola Cup/National Bank Cup league. On Friday, 27 March 1998, Sting made their league debut with a 55–51 win against Auckland Diamonds. The starting lineup included Reinga Bloxham, Kirsty Broughton, Donna Loffhagen and Bernice Mene. Sting finished their debut season as grand finalists and runners up. In the grand final they lost to Otago Rebels 57–50.

=== Sting dominance ===
In 1999, Sting won their first Coca-Cola Cup/National Bank Cup title. In the grand final, they defeated Otago Rebels 63–54. Sting were subsequently the league's most successful team. Between 1998 and 2007, they played in all ten grand finals and won seven of the ten titles played for. Between 1999 and 2004, Sting won six successive titles. The team was coached by Robyn Broughton and featured, among others, Donna Loffhagen, Bernice Mene, Belinda Colling, Tania Dalton, Lesley Nicol and Adine Harper. One reason behind Sting's success was that they were pioneers in women's professional sports. Bernice Mene was one of the first professional netball players in New Zealand. With Sting paying their players, they successfully recruited the best players from throughout New Zealand. In 2007, Sting won their seventh title. With a team featuring Liana Barrett-Chase, Daneka Wipiiti, Megan Hutton and Donna Wilkins, they defeated Northern Force 50–49 in the grand final. The grand final was Robyn Broughton's 100th match in charge of Sting.

=== Merger ===
Ahead of the 2008 season, Sting merged with Otago Rebels to form the new ANZ Championship team, Southern Steel. Robyn Broughton was appointed Steel's first head coach and former Sting player, Megan Hutton, was named co-captain. Liana Barrett-Chase, Erika Burgess, Te Huinga Reo Selby-Rickit, Wendy Telfer and Daneka Wipiiti, who were members of the 2007 Southern Sting squad were all included in the inaugural 2008 Southern Steel team.

=== Reunion ===
On 23 July 2018, Southern Sting marked their 20th anniversary with a charity match against Netball South of the National Netball League. Organised by former Sting player, Donna Wilkins, the match raised $30,000 for the Tania Dalton Foundation. Former Sting player, Tania Dalton, died in 2017 of a brain aneurysm, aged 45. With a team coached by Robyn Broughton and featuring Wilkins, Bernice Mene, Belinda Colling and Natalie Avellino, Sting clinched a 51–50 victory over Netball South.

== Stats ==
Season	Position	Won	Drawn	Lost
1998	2nd	8	0	3
1999	1st	8	0	2
2000	1st	10	0	0
2001	1st	8	0	2
2002	1st	10	0	0
2003	1st	9	0	1
2004	1st	8	0	1
2005	2nd	6	0	4
2006	2nd	6	0	4
2007	1st	8	0	2

Winners Runners Up

== Grand finals ==
=== Coca-Cola Cup ===
Season	Winners	Score	Runners up	Venue
1998	Otago Rebels	57–50	Southern Sting	Edgar Centre
1999	Southern Sting	63–54	Otago Rebels	Edgar Centre
2000	Southern Sting	43–40	Canterbury Flames	Stadium Southland
2001	Southern Sting	47–44	Canterbury Flames	Stadium Southland

=== National Bank Cup ===
Season	Winners	Score	Runners up	Venue
2002	Southern Sting	54–48	Canterbury Flames	Stadium Southland
2003	Southern Sting	51–49	Northern Force	Stadium Southland
2004	Southern Sting	63–55	Canterbury Flames	Stadium Southland
2005	Waikato Bay of Plenty Magic	65–39	Southern Sting	Stadium Southland
2006	Waikato Bay of Plenty Magic	67–43	Southern Sting	Mystery Creek Events Centre
2007	Southern Sting	50–49	Northern Force	North Shore Events Centre

== Notable former players ==
=== Internationals ===
New Zealand

- Liana Barrett-Chase
- Julie Carter
- Belinda Colling
- Leana de Bruin
- Tania Dalton
- Anna Galvan
- Adine Harper
- Donna Loffhagen
- Bernice Mene
- Lesley Nicol
- Te Huinga Reo Selby-Rickit
- Wendy Telfer
- Daneka Wipiiti

Australia

- Natalie Avellino

England

- Naomi Siddall

Fiji

- Bulou Rabuka

South Africa

- Leana de Bruin

=== Captains ===
	Years
Bernice Mene	1998–2002
Lesley Nicol	2003–2005
Adine Wilson	2006
Jenny Ferguson	2007

== Coaches ==
=== Head coaches ===
Coach	Years
Robyn Broughton	1998–2007

=== Assistant coaches ===
Coach	Years
Tania Dalton	2004
Julie Carter	
Belinda Colling	2007

== Honours ==
- Coca-Cola Cup/National Bank Cup
  - Winners: 1999, 2000, 2001, 2002, 2003, 2004, 2007
  - Runners Up: 1998, 2005, 2006
