= Candyce Edwards =

New Zealand netball player

Personal information
- Born: 29 November 1986 (age 39) Hamilton, New Zealand
- Height: 1.88 m (6 ft 2 in)

Netball career
- Playing positions: GK, GD
Years	Club team	Apps
2007	Western Flyers	
2008	Central Pulse	
- Updated on 17 March 2010

Candyce Edwards (born 29 November 1986 in Hamilton, New Zealand) is a New Zealand netball player. Edwards played for the Western Flyers (2007) in the National Bank Cup and the Central Pulse (2008) in the ANZ Championship. After the Pulse failed to secure a win in their inaugural season, much of their player roster was changed and Edwards was not recalled for the 2009 season.
