= Wendy Frew =

New Zealand netball international

Personal information
- Full name: Wendy Frew (Née: Telfer)
- Born: 15 October 1984 (age 42) Invercargill, New Zealand
- Height: 1.74 m (5 ft 9 in)
- School: Verdon College

Netball career
- Playing positions: WD, C, WA
Years	Club team	Apps
2002–2007	Southern Sting	39
2008–2018	Southern Steel	176
Years	National team	Caps
2008–2009	New Zealand	1
Medal record
Representing New Zealand
World Netball Series
Gold medal – first place	2009 Manchester	Team
World Youth Netball Championships
Gold medal – first place	2005 Fort Lauderdale	Team

Wendy Frew (born 15 October 1984), previously known as Wendy Telfer, is a former New Zealand netball international. During the National Bank Cup era, she played for Southern Sting. During the ANZ Championship era and early ANZ Premiership era, she played for Southern Steel. She was a member of six premiership winning teams – the 2002, 2003, 2004 and 2007 Southern Sting teams and the 2017 and 2018 Southern Steel teams. She captained Steel when they won both premierships. She also captained Steel when they won the 2017 Netball New Zealand Super Club tournament. In 2022, she was included on a list of the 25 best players to feature in netball leagues in New Zealand since 1998.

== Early life, family and education ==
Frew was born and raised in Invercargill, Southland. She is the daughter of Karen and Colin Telfer. The Telfer family were based in Rosedale. Wendy was one of eight children. She has a twin sister, Debbie. She also has three younger sisters, Alice (born.1989) Jo and Katie (born c.1994). They are also twins. All four of Wendy's sisters have played representative netball for Southland. Debbie also played for Southern Sting and played softball for New Zealand at under-19 level. The three Telfer brothers – Chris, Michael and Matt – all played for the Junior Black Sox. Wendy attended Verdon College, where her teachers included Robyn Broughton. Wendy is married to Trent Frew, a firefighter. They have two children. Archie, their son, was born in 2012 and Indie, their daughter, was born in 2015.

== Playing career ==
=== Southern Sting ===
Between 2002 and 2007, Telfer made 39 senior appearances for Southern Sting in the National Bank Cup league. She was just 17 and still a schoolgirl when she was recruited by Robyn Broughton to join Sting. While playing for Sting, she a member of four premiership winning teams, helping them win titles in 2002, 2003, 2004 and 2007.

=== Southland NPC ===
In 2008, Telfer captained the Southland team that won the National Provincial Championships. They defeated Auckland Waitakere 56–46 to win their first title in 49 years. The team was coached by Natalie Avellino and also featured Julianna Naoupu.

=== Southern Steel ===
Between 2008 and 2018, Frew played for Southern Steel, initially in the ANZ Championship and later in the ANZ Premiership. In 2009 and 2010, Frew was Steel vice-captain. Ahead of the 2011 season, together with Liana Leota, she was named co-captain. However she missed the 2012 season due to pregnancy. In December 2014, Frew was again named Steel captain. On 5 June 2016, during a Round 10 match against Mainland Tactix, Frew made her 100th ANZ Championship appearance.

On 12 June 2017, Frew was one of six Steel players in a van when it was involved in a road traffic accident in Fendalton, Christchurch. Four of the players were injured, including Frew who received over 70 stitches and underwent surgery. Frew defied the medical experts and within 16 days, she had recovered to captain the 2017 Southern Steel to their first ANZ Premiership title, defeating Central Pulse 69–53 in the grand final. She also captained Steel when they won the 2017 Netball New Zealand Super Club tournament. However during the final against Northern Mystics, she suffered an Achilles tendon rupture that later required surgery. Ahead of the 2018 season, Frew was confirmed as Steel captain for the fifth successive season.

In July 2018, Frew announced she would retire at the end of the Steel's 2018 campaign. On 8 August 2018, for the Elimination final against Mainland Tactix, the ILT Stadium Southland was temporarily re-named the Wendy Frew Stadium in her honour. Frew captained the 2018 Southern Steel to their second ANZ Premiership title, defeating Central Pulse 54–53 in the grand final. She subsequently confirmed her retirement by sharing her celebrations on Instagram, including a Kurt Baker–inspired picture, captioned "That's me. I'm out". Frew posed topless, with two strategically placed netballs, on the shoulders of Gina Crampton as she proudly lifted the ANZ Premiership trophy.

Ahead of the 2020 season, Frew joined Southern Steel as an assistant coach. In May 2021, Steel introduced the Wendy Frew Medal, to be awarded to the Steel player who demonstrates excellence, commitment and loyalty. In April 2022, Frew was included on a list of the 25 best players to feature in netball leagues in New Zealand since 1998.

=== New Zealand ===
Telfer was a member of the New Zealand under-21 team that won the 2005 World Youth Netball Championships. On 2 November 2008, Telfer made her one and only senior appearance for New Zealand, playing the last quarter of a test against Australia. Ruth Aitken included her in further squads throughout 2008–09. However this remained her only senior appearance, finding herself behind Laura Langman and Joline Henry when it came to selection. She was however a member of the New Zealand team that won the 2009 World Netball Series, playing in matches against Malawi, England and Samoa.

== Coaching career ==
Frew was announced as the Southern Steel head coach for the 2025 ANZ Premiership season following the departure of Reinga Bloxham.

== Softball and Touch ==
As well as playing for the New Zealand national netball team, Telfer has also played for the New Zealand women's national softball team and represented New Zealand at touch.

== Honours ==
New Zealand

- World Netball Series
  - Winners: 2009
- World Youth Netball Championships
  - Winners: 2005

Southern Sting

- National Bank Cup
  - Winners: 2002, 2003, 2004, 2007
  - Runners Up: 2005, 2006

Southern Steel

- ANZ Premiership
  - Winners: 2017, 2018
- ANZ Championship
  - Minor premiers: 2016
- Netball New Zealand Super Club
  - Winners: 2017
