= Erika Burgess =

New Zealand netball player

Personal information
- Born: 1 October 1984 (age 41) New Plymouth, New Zealand
- Occupation: Teacher
- Height: 1.81 m (5 ft 11 in)
- Relative: Lauren Burgess (sister)

Netball career
- Playing positions: WD, GD
Years	Club team	Apps
2003–2006	Western Flyers	
2007	Southern Sting	
2008–present	Southern Steel	
- Updated on 15 March 2010

Erika Burgess (born 1 October 1984 in New Plymouth, New Zealand) is a New Zealand netball player. Burgess plays for the Southern Steel in the ANZ Championship, having previously played for the Western Flyers (2003–06) and Southern Sting (2007) in the National Bank Cup. A former member of the New Zealand A squad, Burgess made the extended training squad for the Silver Ferns, although has yet to make it into the senior team.
