= Hayley Crofts =

New Zealand netball player

Personal information
- Born: 23 September 1988 (age 37) Invercargill, New Zealand
- Height: 1.73 m (5 ft 8 in)

Netball career
- Playing positions: WD, C, WA
Years	Club team	Apps
2008	Central Pulse	8
2010	Canterbury Tactix	
Years	National team	Caps
2005–09	New Zealand U21	
- Updated on 15 March 2010

Hayley Crofts (born 23 September 1988 in Invercargill, New Zealand) is a New Zealand netball player. In 2008, she was signed to play for the Central Pulse in the ANZ Championship. Much of the team was replaced after a winless 2008 season, with Crofts not being re-signed for the 2009 season. The following year, she signed with the Canterbury Tactix for the 2010 season.
