= Natalie Avellino =

Australia netball international

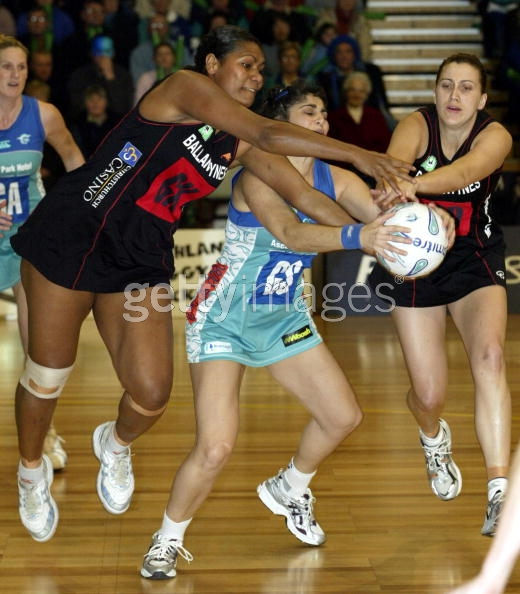
- 18 June 2004: Natalie Avellino (centre) playing for the 2004 Southern Sting against Canterbury Flames in the National Bank Cup final at Stadium Southland. She competes with Flames players Vilimaina Davu (left) and Peta Stephens.

Personal information
- Full name: Natalie Avellino
- Born: 15 December 1970 (age 55) Sydney, New South Wales
- Height: 1.77 m (5 ft 10 in)

Netball career
- Playing positions: WA, GA, GS
Years	Club team	Apps
1989–1991	Australian Institute of Sport	
1993–1996	Adelaide Garville	
1997–1998	Sydney Sandpipers	
1999	Melbourne Phoenix	
2000–2002	Sydney Sandpipers	
2003	Adelaide Thunderbirds	
2004	Southern Sting	
2005	Adelaide Thunderbirds	
2006	AIS Canberra Darters	
2006–2007	Southern Sting	
Years	National team	Caps
1994–2006	Australia	20
Coaching career
- Years: Team
- 200x–2018: Southland Girls' High School
- 2008–2010: Southland NPC
- 2011–2012: Southern Steel
Medal record
Representing Australia
World Netball Championships
Gold medal – first place	1995 Birmingham	Team
Commonwealth Games
Silver medal – second place	2006 Melbourne	Team

Natalie Avellino (born 15 December 1970) is a former Australian netball international and current netball coach. Between 1994 and 2006 she made 20 senior appearances for Australia. Avellino was a member of the Australia teams that won the gold medal at the 1995 World Netball Championships and the silver medal at the 2006 Commonwealth Games.

During the Esso/Mobil Superleague era, Avellino played for the Australian Institute of Sport and Adelaide Garville. In 1993, she was a member of the Garville team that were Australian netball premiers. Between 1997 and 2006, during the Commonwealth Bank Trophy era, she played for Sydney Sandpipers, Melbourne Phoenix, Adelaide Thunderbirds and AIS Canberra Darters. She made 100 Commonwealth Bank Trophy appearances. Between 2004 and 2007, Avellino also played for Southern Sting in Netball New Zealand's National Bank Cup league. She was a prominent member of Sting teams that won league titles in 2004 and 2007.

== Playing career ==
=== Early years ===
Avellino began her netball career with the Model Farms Netball Club in Sydney's north-west. In her junior years, she also played for netball associations representing Baulkham Hills Shire and Parramatta/Auburn.

=== New South Wales ===
Avellino represented New South Wales in the Australian National Netball Championships at under-19, under-21 and Open levels.

=== Esso/Mobil Superleague ===
==== Australian Institute of Sport ====
Between 1989 and 1991, Avellino played for the Australian Institute of Sport in the Esso/Mobil Superleague. She was a member of the 1989 AIS team that finished as runners up to Sydney Tigers.

==== Adelaide Garville ====
Between 1993 and 1996, Avellino played for Adelaide Garville in the Mobil Superleague. In 1993 and 1994, she helped Garville reach two grand finals. In 1993, a Garville team featuring Avellino, Jenny Borlase and Michelle den Dekker and coached by Patricia Mickan, defeated Sydney Electricity and finished as premiers. However, in 1994 Garville lost to their main rivals, Contax, in controversial circumstances. A closely fought match finished level at full time. However Garville claimed they had actually won the match 48–46. It was alleged that during the third quarter, the official scorer accidentally gave one of Garville's goals to Contax. Despite protests from Garville, extra time was played and resulted in a 61–58 win for Contax. Avellino scored 23 from 31 for Garville in the final.

=== Commonwealth Bank Trophy ===
Between 1997 and 2006, during the Commonwealth Bank Trophy era, Avellino made 100 senior appearances. She played most notably for Sydney Sandpipers and Adelaide Thunderbirds, but also had spells with Melbourne Phoenix and AIS Canberra Darters. In 2006 she played in her 100th Commonwealth Bank Trophy match while playing for Darters.

==== Sydney Sandpipers ====
Between 1997 and 2002, Avellino made 71 senior appearances for Sydney Sandpipers in the Commonwealth Bank Trophy league. She made more appearances for Sandpipers than any other player. After spending the 1999 season with Melbourne Phoenix, Avellino returned to Sandpipers in 2000 and helped them achieve their best performance in the league . They finished third in the regular season, above their neighbours, Sydney Swifts. In 2001 and 2002, together with Joanne Morgan, Avellino co-captained Sandpipers. Ahead of the 2003 season, Avellino was dropped from the Sandpipers squad due to an osteitis pubis injury.

==== Adelaide Thunderbirds ====
After being let go by Sydney Sandpipers, Avellino was signed by Adelaide Thunderbirds. However, the move proved controversial. Avellino subsequently missed most of the 2003 season after Netball Australia declared she could not play for Thunderbirds because she was not registered as a resident of South Australia in time. The case went all the way to the Supreme Court of South Australia which ruled in Avellino's favour. In 2005, Avellino had a second spell playing for Thunderbirds.

=== Southern Sting ===
Between 2004 and 2007, Avellino played for Southern Sting in the National Bank Cup league. She was initially signed as cover for Donna Loffhagen. However, after Tania Dalton suffered a season ending injury, Avellino became a prominent member of Sting team that won the league title in 2004. In 2006, she helped Sting finish as runners up. In 2007 she won a second title with Sting. She played for Sting in three grand finals.

=== Australia ===
Between 1994 and 2006, Avellino made 20 senior appearances for Australia. She made her senior debut for Australia on 20 July 1994 against Trinidad and Tobago. She was a member of the Australia team that won the gold medal at the 1995 World Netball Championships. Almost a decade passed before Avellino was recalled to the Australia team. In October 2004 she returned to international netball and was subsequently a member of the Australia team that gained the silver medal at the 2006 Commonwealth Games.

Tournaments	Place
1995 World Netball Championships	1st place, gold medalist(s)
2006 Commonwealth Games	2nd place, silver medalist(s)

== Coaching career ==
=== Head coach ===
==== Southland Girls' High School ====
While playing for Southern Sting, Avellino started working as a sports co-ordinator and netball coach at Southland Girls' High School. She coached SGHS for over a decade. She coached SGHS as they competed in Invercargill, South Island, and national netball tournaments.

==== Southland NPC ====
Between 2008 and 2010, Avellino coached the Southland netball team that competed in the National Provincial Championships. In 2008 she was player coach as Southland defeated Auckland Waitakere 56–46 to win their first title in 49 years. Her Southland teammates included Julianna Naoupu and Wendy Telfer.

==== Southern Steel ====
In May 2011, Avellino and Janine Southby, were appointed co-head coaches of Southern Steel. However, after a poor 2012 ANZ Championship season, which saw Steel win just two matches and lose 11, Steel decided to end the co-coaching experiment. Ahead of the 2013 season, Southby was appointed head coach and Avellino was named as assistant coach. However, this new arrangement survived only four weeks into the new season. It was reported that the two coaches had a falling out and had differences in "coaching philosophies". In April 2013, Avellino was subsequently sacked as Steel assistant coach.

=== Assistant coach ===
==== New Zealand ====
In August 2010, Avellino was appointed assistant coach of the New Zealand Secondary Schools team. She subsequently had a ten-year involvement with the team. She was also Waimarama Taumaunu's assistant coach when New Zealand team that won the 2012 Fast5 Netball World Series.

==== New South Wales Swifts ====
In 2019 she joined Briony Akle's coaching team at the New South Wales Swifts as a specialist shooting coach. She subsequently helped Swifts win the 2019 and 2021 Suncorp Super Netball titles. Ahead of the 2023 season, she was promoted to assistant coach.

== Commentator ==
Between 2009 and 2011, Avellino worked as a commentator for New Zealand's Sky Sport. She also worked as a netball writer for The Southland Times.

== Honours ==
Australia

- World Netball Championships
  - Winners: 1995
- Commonwealth Games
  - Runners Up: 2006

Southern Sting

- National Bank Cup
  - Winners: 2004, 2007
  - Runners Up: 2006

Adelaide Garville

- Mobil Superleague
  - Winners: 1993
  - Runners up: 1994

Australian Institute of Sport

- Esso Super League
  - Runners up: 1989

Individual Awards

Year	Award
2000	Australian Sports Medal
2022	Netball NSW Hall of Fame
