= Reinga Bloxham =

New Zealand netball player and coach

Personal information
- Full name: Reinga Bloxham
- Born: c. 1975 (age 50–51)
- Relative: Georgie Salter (aunt)

Netball career
- Playing positions: WD, C
Years	Club team	Apps
1998–2004	Southern Sting	
2006	Southland	
Coaching career
- Years: Team
- 2009: Southland LMC
- 2010–2013: Southland NPC
- 2014: Netball South U23
- 2016–2024: Southern Steel
- 2024-: Cardiff Dragons

Reinga Bloxham (born c.1975), also known as Reinga Te Huia, is a former New Zealand netball player and current coach. During the Coca-Cola Cup/National Bank Cup era, she played for Southern Sting. From 2016 to 2024, she served as head coach of Southern Steel in the ANZ Premiership. In 2017 and 2018, Bloxham guided Steel to two successive ANZ Premiership titles. In 2024 she was appointed as head coach of the Cardiff Dragons in the Netball Super League.

== Early life and family ==
Bloxham is a Māori with Ngāti Kahungunu affiliations. She was born and raised in Southland. Differing sources give her place of birth as either Gore or Wyndham. She is a niece of Georgie Salter, the former New Zealand netball international. Bloxham is the mother of two children, a son, Te Kaanu (born, c. 2000) and a daughter, Maraea (born, c. 2005). Bloxham is also a primary school teacher.

== Playing career ==
=== Southern Sting ===
Between 1998 and 2004, during the Coca-Cola Cup/National Bank Cup era, Bloxham played as a midcourter for Southern Sting. She was a founding member of the Southern Sting team.

=== Southland ===
Bloxham also played representative netball for Southland in the National Championships.

== Coaching career ==
=== Southland ===
In 2009, Te Huia, together with Jo Cunningham, co-coached the Southland team to victory in the Lois Muir Challenge. In 2010 and 2011, Te Huia and Cunningham co-coached the Southland team in the National Provincial Championships. Te Huia was the sole head coach of the Southland NPC team in both 2012 and 2013.

=== Netball South ===
In 2014 Te Huia was head coach of the Netball South U23 team that finished as runners up in the National U23 Championships.

=== Southern Steel ===
Assistant coach

During the 2013 ANZ Championship season, Te Huia joined Southern Steel as a defensive coach, replacing Natalie Avellino as a member of Steel's coaching staff. In 2014 and 2015, she served as assistant coach to Janine Southby. When Southby was appointed New Zealand head coach, Te Huia unsuccessfully applied for the Steel head coach position. Despite this, she subsequently served Noeline Taurua as assistant coach for the 2016 season and helped Steel finish as minor premiers.

Head coach

In October 2016, ahead of the 2017 season, Southern Steel appointed Te Huia, now Bloxham, as their new head coach. She subsequently guided Steel to an unbeaten season with 21 wins and zero defeats. Steel finished the season as minor premiers and winners of both the 2017 ANZ Premiership and the 2017 Netball New Zealand Super Club. In 2018, Bloxham guided Steel to a second ANZ Premiership title.

=== New Zealand ===
In 2022, Bloxham has worked with New Zealand as head coach of the New Zealand A team and as assistant coach of the senior team.

=== Cardiff Dragons ===
In 2024, Bloxham was appointed as head coach of the Cardiff Dragons.

== Honours ==
=== Coach ===
Southern Steel

- ANZ Premiership
  - Winners: 2017, 2018
  - Minor premiers: 2017
- Netball New Zealand Super Club
  - Winners: 2017

=== Player ===
Southern Sting

- Coca-Cola Cup/National Bank Cup
  - Winners: 1999, 2001, 2002, 2003, 2004
