= Liana Leota =

New Zealand netball player

Personal information
- Full name: Née: Barrett-Chase
- Born: 31 October 1984 (age 41) Taihape, New Zealand
- Height: 1.68 m (5 ft 6 in)
- Spouse: Johnny Leota

Netball career
- Playing positions: C, WA
Years	Club team	Apps
2003–05	Western Flyers	
2006	Waikato/Bay of Plenty Magic	
2007	Southern Sting	
2008–2011	Southern Steel	41
2012-2015	Central Pulse	
2016	Manchester Thunder	
Years	National team	Caps
2003–2004	New Zealand U21	
2005	New Zealand A	
2008–2015	New Zealand	22
Medal record
Representing New Zealand
Commonwealth Games
Gold medal – first place	2010 Delhi	Netball
Silver medal – second place	2014 Glasgow	Netball
World Netball Series
Gold medal – first place	2009 Manchester	Fastnet
- Updated on 13 June 2011

Liana Leota (née Barrett-Chase; born 31 October 1984) is a New Zealand netball player. She is a member of the national netball team, the Silver Ferns, and plays for Severn Stars in the British Netball Superleague.

Leota was a member of the Southern Sting in 2007, which won the National Bank Cup that year. She also played for the Waikato Bay of Plenty Magic in 2006 and the Western Flyers from 2003–2005. She continued playing in Invercargill with the Southern Steel in the new ANZ Championship, which started in 2008. That same year, Leota debuted in the Silver Ferns against Australia. Since her debut, she has cemented her position in the Silver Ferns' midcourt. For the 2010 ANZ Championship season, Leota received the Most valuable Player award. Leota and Wendy Frew were named as co-captains of the Southern Steel for 2011.

She signed for Netball Superleague side Manchester Thunder for the 2016 Season on 27 October 2015. Following a championship winning season with Thunder, Leota signed for Severn Stars in September 2019

She is of Ngāti Tūwharetoa and Ngāti Maniapoto descent.
