= Daneka Wipiiti =

New Zealand netball player

Personal information
- Born: 8 December 1982 (age 43) Hamilton, New Zealand
- Height: 1.94 m (6 ft 4 in)

Netball career
- Playing position: GS
Years	Club team	Apps
1998–2001	Western Flyers	
2002–06	Northern Force	
2007	Southern Sting	
2008–2011	Southern Steel	48
Years	National team	Caps
2002, 2008–2011	New Zealand	18
Medal record
Representing New Zealand
Commonwealth Games
Silver medal – second place	2002 Manchester	Netball
Gold medal – first place	2010 Delhi	Netball
- Updated on 23 January 2011

Daneka Tuineau (nee Wapiiti, born 8 December 1982 in Hamilton, New Zealand) is a former New Zealand international netball player who played for the New Zealand national netball team, the Silver Ferns, and the Southern Steel in the ANZ Championship. Nicknamed "Sneaky" as she is one of the first players to shoot from the edge of the goal circle before the advent of Fast5 netball and two-point zones.

Wipiiti started her netball career in 1998 for the Western Flyers as a 15-year-old in the National Bank Cup. She transferred to the Northern Force in 2002, playing with them until 2006. In 2007, Wipiiti joined the National Bank Cup–winning Southern Sting, coached by Robyn Broughton. She stayed in Southland with the start of the ANZ Championship in 2008, joining the new Southern Steel franchise.

Wipiiti was a surprise name in the Silver Ferns for the 2002 Commonwealth Games at only 19 years of age. She was dropped in 2003, and played with the New Zealand A team from 2004 to 2006. She regained her position in the Silver Ferns in 2008, but pulled out the following year due to pregnancy, before returning in 2010.

== Post-playing career ==
Wapiti swapped her focus to basketball, and had trials with the national basketball team. She is now a personal trainer for F45 Manukau. She is the wife of Joe Tuineau. She revealed that her father passed away in 2018, so her uniform was still using her maiden name when she played as a Silver Fern in the final of Game On.
