= Leana de Bruin =

South African-New Zealand netball player

Personal information
- Full name: Leana de Bruin (Née: du Plooy)
- Born: 9 July 1977 (age 49) Bethlehem, Free State, South Africa
- Height: 1.90 m (6 ft 3 in)

Netball career
- Playing positions: GD, GK
Years	Club team	Apps
2001	Southern Sting	
2002	Capital Shakers	
2003–2004	Waikato Bay of Plenty Magic	
2005–2007	Northern Force	
2008	Northern Mystics	
2009	Waikato Bay of Plenty Magic	
2010–2011	Southern Steel	
2012–2016	Waikato Bay of Plenty Magic	
2017	Northern Stars	
2018	Adelaide Thunderbirds	
2019	Northern Stars	
Years	National team	Caps
?	South Africa	34
2002–16	New Zealand	104
Medal record
Representing New Zealand
Netball World Cup
Gold medal – first place	2003 Kingston	Netball
Silver medal – second place	2007 Auckland	Netball
Silver medal – second place	2011 Singapore	Netball
Silver medal – second place	2015 Sydney	Netball
Commonwealth Games
Gold medal – first place	2006 Melbourne	Netball
Gold medal – first place	2010 Delhi	Netball
Silver medal – second place	2014 Glasgow	Netball
- Updated on 20 May 2018

Leana de Bruin (née du Plooy) (born 9 July 1977) is a South African and New Zealand international netball player. De Bruin played 34 tests for South Africa before moving to New Zealand in 2000. She made her on-court debut for the Silver Ferns in 2003, and has gone on to represent New Zealand at the Commonwealth Games and Netball World Championships, playing in the goal defence and goal keeper positions. In 2009, she pulled out of the team due to pregnancy, before returning the following year.

De Bruin played for the Southern Sting, Capital Shakers, Waikato Bay of Plenty Magic and the Northern Force in the National Bank Cup. With the start of the ANZ Championship in 2008, de Bruin stayed in Auckland with the new Northern Mystics franchise. The following year, she returned to the Magic in Hamilton, partnering in the defensive circle with Silver Ferns teammate Casey Williams. De Bruin played most of the 2009 round-robin season before pulling out due to pregnancy. She returned to competitive netball the following year, signing with the Southern Steel for the 2010 season, before returning to the Magic in 2012 for the remainder of the ANZ Championship.

She announced that she would retire from international netball in July 2016. Domestically, she signed with the Northern Stars for the inaugural season of the new ANZ Premiership, delaying her retirement from all forms of the game. She signed with Australian club Adelaide Thunderbirds for the 2018 Suncorp Super Netball season. She was named captain of the Thunderbirds prior to the start of the season. de Bruin was captain at a difficult time for the club, as the Thunderbirds went winless for the entire season. She then returned to the Northern Stars for the 2019 season, extending her career beyond 17 years.

In 2025 she was appointed as assistant coach for the Northern Stars. In 2026 she played for the Northern Stars as injury cover for Lili Tokaduadua.
