= Edgar Centre =

Multi-purpose indoor sports venue in South Dunedin, New Zealand

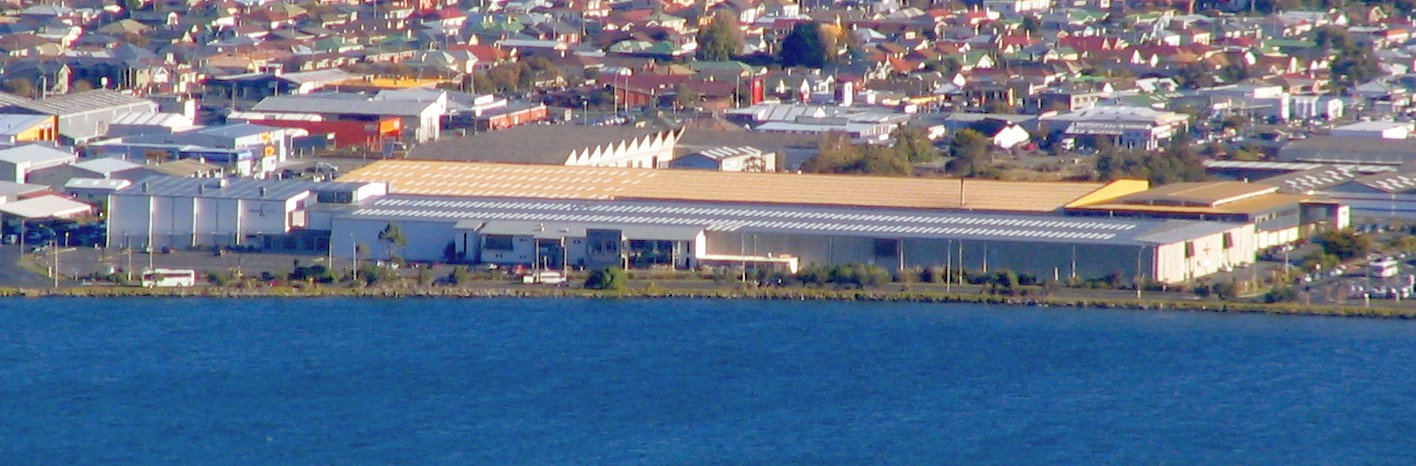
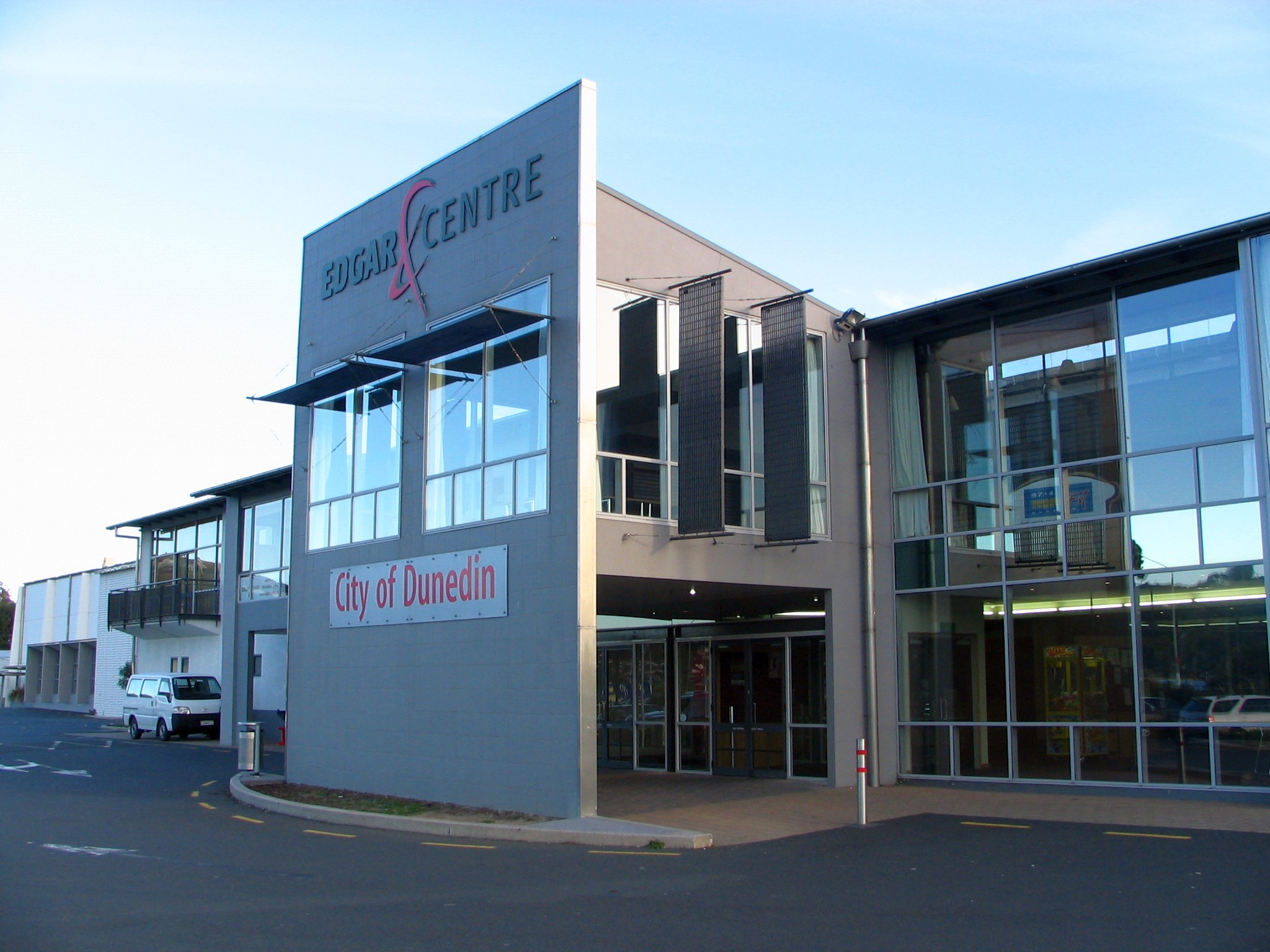
- Interactive map of Edgar Centre
- Location: Portsmouth Drive, Dunedin, New Zealand
- Coordinates: 45°53′33″S 170°30′42″E
- Owner: Dunedin City Council
- Operator: Edgar Centre Board
- Capacity: 2,880
- Surface: Balsam ProBounce sand filled synthetic carpet courts (16); ASF Hormer PR1 Messemate timber floor courts (7)
- Scoreboard: Yes
- Field size: approx 81 x 177 m

Construction
- Opened: 1995
- Expanded: 2005

Tenants
- Otago Nuggets (2010–2014) (NBL); Southern Steel (2008–present) (ANZ Championship)

The Edgar Centre is a large multi-purpose indoor sports venue in South Dunedin, New Zealand, on the shore of Otago Harbour close to Andersons Bay Inlet. It is the home venue of the Otago Nuggets basketball team, and an alternate venue for the Southern Steel netball team. The centre also hosts a wide variety of other sports events and community events such as auctions and fairs, and is owned by the Dunedin City Council. Since 2023, it has been the site of the annual Regent Book Sale.

The building is named after Dunedin millionaire and philanthropist Eion Edgar. Originally a wool-store, it was purchased and converted by the Dunedin City Council at a cost of NZ$2.5 million, of which 20% was provided by Edgar. The building was officially opened by Queen Elizabeth II in 1995, and won the Hillary Commission's 1996 Win-Win Facility Award. Extensions were carried out during 1996, which included the addition of a seminar room, refreshment facilities, foyer, and control rooms. In 2005, extra work was carried out, extending the playing area with the addition of the Lion Foundation Arena (now the Breeze Arena), which also includes a medical centre and enlarged viewing areas. The Arena is also used for functions and events, hosting up to 1,600 dinner guests.

The centre contains five ASF Hormer PR1 Messemate timber floor courts suitable and marked for netball, basketball, and volleyball. It can be set up to provide 5 basketball courts, 21 netball courts, or 16 indoor tennis courts. Nets are also available for cricket training. In 2007 the centre hosted a Davis Cup tie with Pacific Oceania. The main arena at the Edgar Centre is the Breeze Arena (formerly the More FM Arena and originally the Lion Foundation Arena), which is the home venue of the Otago Nuggets basketball team and one of the home venues of the Southern Steel netball franchise.

At 14.4 hectares, the centre is the largest single-building indoor sports arena in the Southern Hemisphere.
