= Western Flyers =

Defunct New Zealand netball team

- Founded: 1998; 28 years ago
- Disbanded: 2007; 19 years ago
- Based in: New Plymouth; Whanganui; Napier; Palmerston North
- Region: Hawke's Bay; Manawatū-Whanganui; Taranaki
- Home venue: TSB Stadium; Pettigrew Green Arena; Arena Manawatu
- League: Coca-Cola Cup/National Bank Cup
Uniform

Western Flyers are a former New Zealand netball team that represented Hawke's Bay, Manawatū-Whanganui and Taranaki. Between 1998 and 2007, Flyers played in the Coca-Cola Cup/National Bank Cup league. Ahead of the 2008 season, Flyers merged with Capital Shakers to form the new ANZ Championship team, Central Pulse.

== History ==
=== Founding members ===
In 1998, together with Auckland Diamonds, Bay of Plenty Magic, Capital Shakers, Canterbury Flames, Counties Manukau Cometz, Northern Force, Otago Rebels, Southern Sting and Waikato Wildcats, Flyers, were founding members of the Coca-Cola Cup/National Bank Cup league.

=== Merger ===
Ahead of the 2008 season, Flyers merged with Capital Shakers to form the new ANZ Championship team, Central Pulse.

== Home venues ==
Flyers represented Netball New Zealand's Western and Eastern regions. This included Hawke's Bay, Manawatū-Whanganui and Taranaki. They played their home matches at New Plymouth's TSB Stadium, Napier's Pettigrew Green Arena and Palmerston North's Arena Manawatu.

== Stats ==
Season	Position	Won	Drawn	Lost
1998	7th			
1999	8th			
2000	8th			
2001	6th			
2002	8th			
2003	9th			
2004	8th			
2005	7th			
2006	8th			
2007	8th			

== Notable former players ==
=== Internationals ===
New Zealand

- Liana Barrett-Chase
- Joline Henry
- Te Huinga Reo Selby-Rickit
- Jessica Tuki
- Daneka Wipiiti

New Zealand Fast5

- Charlotte Kight

Australia

- Joanne Morgan

Samoa

- Brooke Williams

=== ANZ Championship players ===
- Amber Bellringer
- Erika Burgess
- Lauren Burgess
- Candyce Edwards
- Hayley Stockman
- Jodi Tod

=== ANZ Championship coaches ===
- Yvette McCausland-Durie
- Janine Southby

=== Captains ===
	Years
Abbie Bailey-Knowell	2007

== Coaches ==
=== Head coaches ===
Coach	Years
Barbara Clarke	2001
Yvette McCausland-Durie	2004–2005
Tanya Dearns	2006
Annette Pearce	2007

== Main sponsors ==
Sponsors	Seasons
More FM	20xx–2007
