= Megan Hutton =

New Zealand netball player

Personal information
- Born: 26 March 1976 (age 50) Christchurch, New Zealand
- Height: 1.87 m (6 ft 2 in)

Netball career
- Playing position: GK
Years	Club team	Apps
1999–2000	Canterbury Flames	
2001–2003	Southern Sting	
2004	Capital Shakers	
2005–2007	Southern Sting	
2007–2008	Team Northumbria	
2008–2009	Southern Steel	
2010	Canterbury Tactix	
- Updated on 3 April 2010

Megan Hutton (born 26 March 1976 in Christchurch, New Zealand) is a New Zealand retired netball player. Hutton normally plays in the goal keeper position. She also played basketball for Southland.

Hutton debuted in the Coca-Cola Cup (later the National Bank Cup) in 1999 with the Canterbury Flames, joining Silver Ferns defenders Vilimaina Davu and Anna Veronese. After two years with the Canterbury franchise, Hutton transferred to the Southland-based Southern Sting. In 2004, Hutton moved north to play with the Capital Shakers, but after one year with the Wellington-based side, Hutton made a controversial return to the Sting, where she remained for the rest of the National Bank Cup.

The National Bank Cup concluded in 2007 with the Sting winning a closely fought 50–49 final over the Northern Force. After the final National Bank Cup, Hutton moved to England and played in the 2007–08 Netball Superleague for Team Northumbria. The inclusion of Hutton and two Australian imports were noted as contributing factors in Team Northumbria's improved performance over the season.

She returned to New Zealand for the start of the ANZ Championship, again playing in Southland, this time for the new Southern Steel franchise. Hutton played two seasons in the Steel, before retiring from netball after 2009. She was lured out of retirement the following year as a temporary replacement player for the Canterbury Tactix, after veteran defender Anna Galvan sustained a wrist injury.
