= Capital Shakers =

Defunct New Zealand netball team

- Founded: 1998; 28 years ago
- Disbanded: 2007; 19 years ago
- Based in: Wellington
- Region: Wellington Region
- Home venue: TSB Bank Arena
- League: Coca-Cola Cup/National Bank Cup
- Website: www.capitalshakers.co.nz
Uniform

Capital Shakers are a former New Zealand netball team that were based in Wellington. Between 1998 and 2007, Shakers played in the Coca-Cola Cup/National Bank Cup league. Between 2000 and 2002, Shakers were semi-finalists three years in succession. Ahead of the 2008 season, Shakers merged with Western Flyers to form the new ANZ Championship team, Central Pulse.

== History ==
=== Founding members ===
In 1998, together with Auckland Diamonds, Bay of Plenty Magic, Canterbury Flames, Counties Manukau Cometz, Northern Force, Otago Rebels, Southern Sting, Waikato Wildcats and Western Flyers, Shakers, were founding members of the Coca-Cola Cup/National Bank Cup league.

=== Irene van Dyk era ===
Between 2000 and 2002, Shakers were semi-finalists three years in succession. They finished third in 2000 and fourth in 2001 and 2002. Between 2000 and 2002, Irene van Dyk played for Shakers. In 2000, van Dyk scored 367 goals from 396 attempts with a 93% shooting success rate as she helped a Shakers team coached by Lois Muir and captained by Noeline Taurua reach their first semi-final. However, they subsequently lost 50–35 to Canterbury Flames. In 2001, with a team coached by Tanya Dearns, captained by Gail Parata and featuring Debbie Matoe, Frances Solia, Jodi Te Huna and van Dyk, Shakers defeated Southern Sting 51–48 in a Round 4 match. It ended a winning run of 18 matches over two years for Sting. During the 2001 season, van Dyk had a 91% shooting success rate as she played a major role in leading Shakers to their second semi-final. However, they lost 60–49 to Sting. In 2002, Shakers qualified for their third semi-final. However, they were once again defeated by Sting, losing 68–49.

=== Merger ===
Ahead of the 2008 season, Shakers merged with Western Flyers to form the new ANZ Championship team, Central Pulse.

== Stats ==
Season	Position	Won	Drawn	Lost
1998	8th			
1999	7th			
2000	3rd			
2001	4th			
2002	4th			
2003	8th			
2004	7th			
2005	8th			
2006	6th			
2007	7th	1	0	6

== Notable former players ==
=== Internationals ===
New Zealand

- Leana de Bruin
- Tanya Dearns
- Debbie Fuller
- Gail Parata
- Julie Seymour
- Noeline Taurua
- Jodi Te Huna
- Irene van Dyk

England

- Karen Aspinall
- Helen Lonsdale
- Olivia Murphy
- Amanda Newton

Hong Kong

- Victoria Smith

Samoa

- Gene Solia-Gibb
- Frances Solia

South Africa

- Leana de Bruin
- Irene van Dyk

=== ANZ Championship players ===
- Jamilah Gupwell
- Megan Hutton
- Brigette Tapene

=== Captains ===
	Years
Noeline Taurua	2000
Gail Parata	2001
Debbie Matoe	2002
Cushla Lichtwark	2006
Frances Solia	2007

== Coaches ==
=== Head coaches ===
Coach	Years
Lois Muir	1998–2000
Tanya Dearns	2001–2002
Maria Lynch	2003
Sheryl George-Burns	2004–2005
Waimarama Taumaunu	2006–2007

=== Assistant coaches ===
Coach	Years
Tanya Dearns	2000
Waimarama Taumaunu	2004
Gail Parata	2007

== Main sponsors ==
Sponsors	Seasons
Genesis Energy	20xx–2007
