= Canterbury Flames =

Defunct New Zealand netball team

- Founded: 1998; 28 years ago
- Disbanded: 2007; 19 years ago
- Based in: Christchurch
- Regions: Canterbury; Tasman
- Home venue: Westpac Centre
- League: Coca-Cola Cup/National Bank Cup
- Website: www.canterburyflames.org.nz
Uniform
Uniform

Canterbury Flames were a New Zealand netball team based in Christchurch, Canterbury. Between 1998 and 2007 they played in the Coca-Cola Cup/National Bank Cup league. Between 2000 and 2002, Flames played in three successive grand finals. In 2004, they played in their fourth grand final. On all four occasions, they lost out to Southern Sting. In 2008, when the National Bank Cup was replaced by the ANZ Championship, Canterbury Flames were rebranded as Canterbury Tactix.

== History ==
=== Founding members ===
In 1998, together with, Auckland Diamonds, Bay of Plenty Magic, Capital Shakers, Counties Manukau Cometz, Northern Force, Otago Rebels, Southern Sting, Waikato Wildcats and Western Flyers, Flames, were founding members of the Coca-Cola Cup/National Bank Cup league.

=== Rebrand ===
In 2008, when the National Bank Cup was replaced by the ANZ Championship, Canterbury Flames were rebranded as Canterbury Tactix. Canterbury Tactix were subsequently renamed Mainland Tactix.

== Home venues ==
Flames played the majority of their home matches at Christchurch's Westpac Centre.

== Stats ==
| Season | Position | Won | Drawn | Lost |
|---|---|---|---|---|
| 1998 | 3rd | | | |
| 1999 | 6th | | | |
| 2000 | 2nd | | | |
| 2001 | 2nd | | | |
| 2002 | 2nd | | | |
| 2003 | 6th | | | |
| 2004 | 2nd | | | |
| 2005 | 6th | | | |
| 2006 | 4th | | | |
| 2007 | 5th | 4 | 0 | 3 |

Runners Up

== Grand finals ==
=== Coca-Cola Cup ===
| Season | Winners | Score | Runners up | Venue |
|---|---|---|---|---|
| 2000 | Southern Sting | 43–40 | Canterbury Flames | Stadium Southland |
| 2001 | Southern Sting | 47–44 | Canterbury Flames | Stadium Southland |

=== National Bank Cup ===
| Season | Winners | Score | Runners up | Venue |
|---|---|---|---|---|
| 2002 | Southern Sting | 54–48 | Canterbury Flames | Stadium Southland |
| 2004 | Southern Sting | 63–55 | Canterbury Flames | Stadium Southland |

== Notable former players ==
=== Internationals ===
New Zealand

- Maree Bowden
- Belinda Charteris
- Belinda Colling
- Vilimaina Davu
- Margaret Foster
- Debbie Fuller
- Katrina Grant
- Angela Mitchell
- Julie Seymour
- Jodi Te Huna
- Anna Thompson
- Anna Veronese

New Zealand Fast5

- Charlotte Kight

Australia

- Cynna Kydd

Fiji

- Vilimaina Davu

Samoa

- Julianna Naoupu

Wales

- Ursula Bowers

=== ANZ Championship players ===
- Megan Hutton
- Elizabeth Manu
- Jo McCaw
- Peta Stephens
- Jade Topia

=== Captains ===
| | Years |
|---|---|
| Belinda Colling | 2001–2004 |
| Julie Seymour | 2004 |
| Vilimaina Davu | 2005 |
| Julie Seymour | 2007 |

== Coaches ==
=== Head coaches ===
| Coach | Years |
|---|---|
| Leigh Gibbs | 1998–1999 |
| Margaret Foster | 2000 |
| Leigh Gibbs | 2001 |
| Margaret Foster | 2002–2007 |

=== Assistant coaches ===
| Coach | Years |
|---|---|
| Helen Mahon-Stroud | 2007 |

== Main sponsors ==
| Sponsors | Seasons |
|---|---|
| Ballantynes | c. 2001–2005 |
| Goldair | 2007 |

== Honours ==
- Coca-Cola Cup/National Bank Cup
  - Runners Up: 2000, 2001, 2002, 2004

== Gallery ==
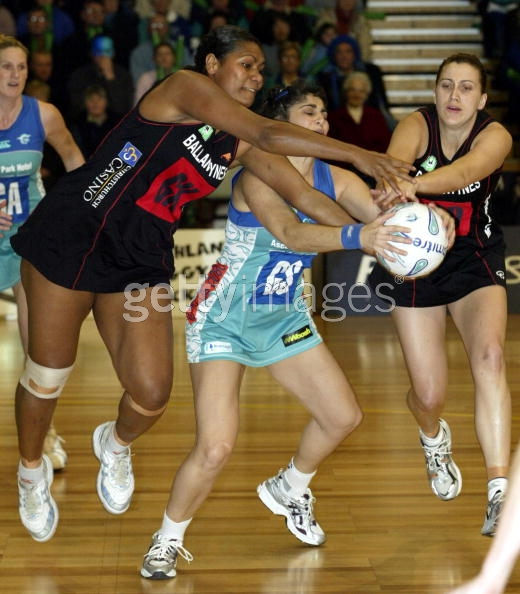
18 June 2004: Vilimaina Davu (left) and Peta Stephens (right) playing for Canterbury Flames against Southern Sting in the 2004 National Bank Cup final at Stadium Southland. They compete with Sting's Natalie Avellino.
