= Tania Dalton =

New Zealand netball international

Personal information
- Full name: Tania Mary Dalton (Née: Nicholson)
- Born: 26 November 1971 Takapuna, New Zealand
- Died: 1 March 2017 (aged 45) Auckland, New Zealand
- Occupation: Sports commentator
- Height: 1.84 m (6 ft 0 in)
- Spouse: Duane Dalton
- Children: 3

Netball career
- Playing positions: GS, GA
Years	Club team	Apps
1998–2000	Northern Force	
2002–2006	Southern Sting	
2008, 2011	Southern Steel (TRP)	
Years	National team	Caps
1996–2007	New Zealand	12
Medal record
Representing New Zealand
Netball World Championships
Gold medal – first place	2003 Kingston	Netball

Tania Mary Dalton (née Nicholson; 26 November 1971 – 1 March 2017) was a New Zealand international netball player. After retiring from playing professionally, she worked as a netball commentator on SKY Sports for international tests, the ANZ Championship and National Championships, alongside former internationals Anna Stanley, Natalie Avellino, Kathryn Harby-Williams and Bernice Mene. Dalton was also a part owner of the franchise food outlet chain, Pita Pit New Zealand Limited.

== Career ==
Dalton was a member of the New Zealand national netball team, the Silver Ferns, from 1996 to 2004 and from 2006 to 2007; she was also named in 2005 but was forced out through injury. She played domestic netball for the Northern Force from 1998 until 2000, and the championship-winning Southern Sting from 2002 to 2006. She was part of the 2003 Netball World Championships winning Silver Ferns squad. She made 12 caps for the Silver Ferns in total, playing in the positions of goal shooter (GS) and goal attack (GA). In 2007, she withdrew from the Silver Ferns to concentrate on family commitments.

In 2008, Dalton made a minor comeback to elite netball replacing injured Australian import Megan Dehn in the Southern Steel line. She did not take the court but was also offered a two-game contract by Northern Mystics who lost Paula Griffin to injury, which she declined.

During the 2011 ANZ Championship pre-season, Southern Steel shooter Daneka Wipiiti injured her ankle and was ruled out of action for up to a week. Dalton returned to the Steel as a temporary replacement player on 14 February that year.

== Death ==
Dalton collapsed on 23 February 2017 while playing a regular game of social touch rugby in her home suburb of Takapuna, Auckland. She was running at the time and was not injured in the game. She was immediately hospitalised in a critical condition with a ruptured internal carotid artery aneurysm. On 28 February, her family agreed to the removal of her life support therapy. She died on 1 March.
