= Lesley Rumball =

New Zealand netball player

Lesley Rumball ONZM
Personal information
- Full name: Lesley Rumball (Née: Nicol)
- Born: 9 May 1973 (age 53) Invercargill, New Zealand
- Occupations: Sports and exercise physician Winner of the George Pitsis trophy at the 2011 Australasian College of Sports Physicians registrar conference.
- Height: 1.78 m (5 ft 10 in)

Netball career
- Playing positions: WD, C
Years	Club team	Apps
1993-1997	Albion	
1998-1999	Otago Rebels	
2000–2006	Southern Sting	
Years	National team	Caps
1993–2005	New Zealand	109
Medal record
Representing New Zealand
Netball World Championships
Bronze medal – third place	1995 Manchester	Netball
Silver medal – second place	1999 Christchurch	Netball
Gold medal – first place	2003 Kingston	Netball
Commonwealth Games
Silver medal – second place	1998 Kuala Lumpur	Netball
Silver medal – second place	2002 Manchester	Netball
- Updated on 31 May 2010

Lesley Marie Rumball ONZM (née Nicol, born 9 May 1973) is a former New Zealand netball player. Rumball played with the New Zealand national netball team, the Silver Ferns, from 1993 to 2005. She represented New Zealand in 109 tests to become the second most capped player in Silver Ferns history behind Irene van Dyk. Rumball played as a midcourt defender during her top-level netball career, before her retirement in 2006.

== Silver Ferns career ==
Rumball debuted for the national team, the Silver Ferns, in 1993. During her time with the Silver Ferns, she played in three Netball World Championships (1995, 1999, 2003) and two Commonwealth Games (1998, 2002). She was co-captain of the Silver Ferns with Bernice Mene from 1999 to 2001 and 2003 to 2004; she was also vice-captain in 1998, 2002 and 2005.

== Domestic netball ==
Rumball played for the Otago Rebels in the National Bank Cup in 1998, with the Rebels winning the title that season. The following year she changed to Southern Sting in 1999, under coach Robyn Broughton. With the Sting she also won Cup titles every year from 1999 to 2004, and 2nd place in 2005 and 2006. She also became Sting captain in 2003 after Bernice Mene retired from all levels of netball.

Rumball retired from the Silver Ferns in 2005 and the Southern Sting in 2006.

== Outside of netball ==
She married Chris Rumball, who is also a doctor. She and her husband travelled overseas following her retirement from top-level netball, living two years in the United Kingdom followed by a year at the Australian Institute of Sport in Canberra. She subsequently moved back to New Zealand to continue her career in sports medicine through Australasian College of Sport and Exercise Physicians.

In the 2004 New Year Honours Rumball was appointed an Officer of the New Zealand Order of Merit for services to netball.
