= Northern Force =

Defunct New Zealand netball team

- Founded: 1998; 28 years ago
- Disbanded: 2007; 19 years ago
- Based in: North Shore, Auckland
- Regions: Auckland
- Home venue: North Shore Events Centre
- League: Coca-Cola Cup/National Bank Cup
Uniform

Northern Force are a former New Zealand netball team based on the North Shore, Auckland Region. As a result, they were also known as either North Harbour Force or North Shore Force. Between 1998 and 2007, Force played in the Coca-Cola Cup/National Bank Cup league. In 2003 and 2007, they played in the grand final. Ahead of the 2008 season, Force merged with Auckland Diamonds to form the new ANZ Championship team, Northern Mystics.

== History ==
=== Founding members ===
In 1998, together with, Auckland Diamonds, Bay of Plenty Magic, Capital Shakers, Canterbury Flames, Counties Manukau Cometz, Otago Rebels, Southern Sting, Waikato Wildcats and Western Flyers, Force, were founding members of the Coca-Cola Cup/National Bank Cup league. Together with Cometz and Diamonds, Force were one of three teams from the Auckland Region to play in the league. Due to poor ticket sales, the three teams faced early suggestions that they should merge.

=== Merger ===
Ahead of the 2008 season, Diamonds merged with Northern Force to form the new ANZ Championship team, Northern Mystics.

== Home venues ==
Between 1998 and 2007, Force played out of the North Shore Events Centre.

== Stats ==
Season	Position	Won	Drawn	Lost
1998	5th			
1999	3rd			
2000	4th			
2001	5th			
2002	3rd			
2003	2nd			
2004	4th			
2005	3rd			
2006	3rd			
2007	2nd			

Runners Up

== Grand finals ==
Season	Winners	Score	Runners up	Venue
2003	Southern Sting	51–49	Northern Force	Stadium Southland
2007	Southern Sting	50–49	Northern Force	North Shore Events Centre

== Notable former players ==
=== Internationals ===
New Zealand

- Jenny-May Coffin
- Tania Dalton
- Vilimaina Davu
- Leana de Bruin
- Temepara George
- Sonya Hardcastle
- Cathrine Latu
- Sheryl Scanlan
- Lorna Suafoa
- Teresa Tairi
- Daneka Wipiiti
- Linda Vagana

Australia

- Megan Dehn

Fiji

- Vilimaina Davu

Samoa

- Cathrine Latu
- Sheryl Scanlan
- Lorna Suafoa

South Africa

- Leana de Bruin

=== ANZ Championship players ===
- Brigette Tapene
- Angelina Yates

=== Captains ===
	Years
Temepara George	200x–2007

== Coaches ==
=== Head coaches ===
Coach	Years
Mary Jane Araroa	1998
Alison Wieringa	1999
Maria Lynch	2000–2002
Yvonne Willering	2002–2007

== Main sponsors ==
Sponsors	Seasons
R'Toto	c. 2002
Fujifilm	200x–2007

== Honours ==
- Coca-Cola Cup/National Bank Cup
  - Runners Up: 2003, 2007
