= Robyn Broughton =

New Zealand netball coach (1943–2023)

Robyn Broughton ONZM
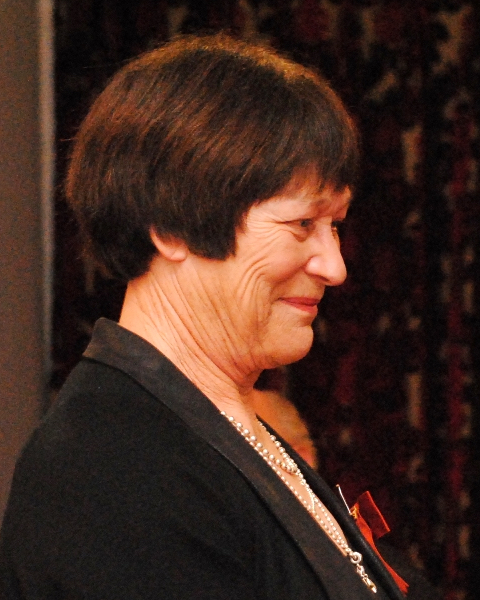
- Broughton in 2012

Personal information
- Full name: Robyn Denise Broughton (Née: Quirke)
- Born: 10 July 1943 Lower Hutt, New Zealand
- Died: 6 September 2023 (aged 80) Christchurch, New Zealand
- Occupations: Netball coach; Physical education teacher
- Spouse: Warren Broughton
- Relative: Kirsty Carline (daughter)
- School: Hutt Valley High School
- University: University of Otago

Netball career
Coaching career
- Years: Team
- 1998–2007: Southern Sting
- 2008–2011: Southern Steel
- 2012–2015: Central Pulse
- 2000–2002: Silver Ferns (assistant coach)
- 2010: FastNet Ferns

Robyn Denise Broughton ONZM (née Quirke; 10 July 1943 – 6 September 2023) was a New Zealand netball coach. Broughton coached the Southern Sting from 1998 to 2007 during the National Bank Cup, winning seven titles in ten years. She was also an assistant coach for the New Zealand national netball team from 2000 to 2002, and a national selector. From 2012 to 2015, Broughton coached the Central Pulse in the ANZ Championship, after four years with the Southern Steel and later coached the Hertfordshire Mavericks in the Netball Superleague.

== Early life and family ==
Broughton was born Robyn Denise Quirke, the daughter of Jim and Margaret Quirke, in Lower Hutt on 10 July 1943. Growing up, she played netball, softball and tennis. She was educated at Hutt Valley High School, and went on to study physical education at the University of Otago, where she completed a Diploma of Physical Education in 1963. While at Otago, she played in defence for the Otago netball team, and also met her future husband, Warren Broughton, who was a law student. She taught briefly at Columba College, but moved to Southland in 1964 or 1965 after marrying. The Broughtons had three children, including netball player and coach Kirsty Carline.

== Domestic netball ==
The National Bank Cup (NBC) started in 1998 as New Zealand's first franchise-based netball competition. Broughton was appointed head coach of the Invercargill-based Southern Sting, and remained with the franchise throughout the competition's ten-year run. During her time with the Sting, Broughton took the team to the grand final every year, winning seven titles.

With the start of the ANZ Championship, Broughton was appointed head coach of the Southern Steel, a merger franchise between the Southern Sting and Otago Rebels. She remained in the role from 2008 to 2011. The Steel franchise board readvertised the role for the head coaching position following a troubled 2011 season. Broughton chose not to reapply, and was later signed by troubled Wellington franchise the Central Pulse for their 2012 campaign.

== World Seven ==
Broughton also coached a touring World 7 side (retired or former international players from New Zealand, with current players from England, Jamaica and Samoa) against the Australia national netball team in a one-off test in Adelaide on 2 September 2009, after three tests against the Silver Ferns. The team was not expected to win but Broughton and her side picked up one of the biggest results in international netball with a 52–43 win. The World 7 side included players such as Donna Wilkins (her Southern Steel shooter), along with English international defenders Geva Mentor and Sonia Mkoloma. New Zealand Silver Fern squad member and Steel midcourter Wendy Telfer, Northern Mystics' Debbie White and New Zealand–based Samoans Frances Solia and Catherine Latu were also part of the side.

== Fastnet Ferns ==
In 2010, Broughton was asked to head a new project and take over as coach of the FastNet Ferns team, who play at the annual World FastNet Series. Silver Ferns coach Ruth Aitken stepped down from the position after the inaugural 2009 tournament. Netball New Zealand told Broughton in September that the side would be filled with developing players, an approach also adopted by the Australian FastNet Diamonds.

At the 2010 World Netball Series, the FastNet Ferns struggled during their round robin matches, going down to Australia in their opening match, losing by two goals to England and scraping a draw against Jamaica. Nevertheless, the Ferns still managed to qualify for the finals. New Zealand went on to battle Jamaica in a tight, physical semi-final, with the Ferns upsetting the Sunshine Girls to move to the final. England dispatched Australia in the other semi. The FastNet Ferns defeated England in the 2010 final, retaining the FastNet Series title.

Broughton was commended in her role as head coach, leading basically a New Zealand development side to victory over much stronger English and Jamaican teams.

== Death and legacy ==
Broughton died in Christchurch on 6 September 2023, at the age of 80. The Robyn Broughton Trophy, awarded to the ANZ Premiership coach of the year, is named in her honour.

== Honours ==
Broughton was appointed a Member of the New Zealand Order of Merit, for services to netball and the community, in the 2004 New Year Honours. In the 2012 Queen's Birthday and Diamond Jubilee Honours, she was promoted to Officer of the New Zealand Order of Merit, for services to netball.
