= 2004 Southern Sting season =

Southern Sting season

Southern Sting
- 2004 season
- Head coach: Robyn Broughton
- Asst. coach: Tania Dalton
- Manager: Jackie Barron
- Captain: Lesley Nicol
- Main venue: Stadium Southland

Season results
- Wins–losses: 8–1
- Season placing: 1st
- Team colours

Southern Sting seasons
- ← 2003 2005 →

The 2004 Southern Sting season saw the Southern Sting netball team compete in the 2004 National Bank Cup league season. With a team coached by Robyn Broughton, captained by Lesley Nicol and featuring Natalie Avellino, Adine Harper, Donna Loffhagen and Wendy Telfer, Sting won their sixth consecutive league title after defeating Canterbury Flames in both the major semi-final and the grand final.

== Players ==
=== Player movements ===
Gains and losses
▲ Gains	▼ Losses
Natalie Avellino (Adelaide Thunderbirds); Reinga Te Huia; Kylie Smith	Megan Hutton (Capital Shakers); Kate Lundy; Gemma Russell; Jo Tapper

=== 2004 roster ===
2004 Southern Sting roster
Players
Coaching staff

Nat.	Name	Position(s)	DoB	Height
(Australia)	Natalie Avellino	WA, GA, GS	15 December 1970 (aged 33)	1.77 m (5 ft 10 in)
(New Zealand)	Sarah Barnes	WD, GD, GK	(aged 22)	1.80 m (5 ft 11 in)
(New Zealand)	Tania Dalton^{1} (injured)	GS, GA	26 November 1971 (aged 32)	1.84 m (6 ft 0 in)
(New Zealand)	Jenny Ferguson	GD, WD	(aged 25)	1.82 m (6 ft 0 in)
(New Zealand)	Anna Galvan	GK, GD, WD	20 November 1978 (aged 25)	1.84 m (6 ft 0 in)
(New Zealand)	Adine Harper	WA, C, GA	8 June 1979 (aged 24)	1.76 m (5 ft 9 in)
(New Zealand)	Donna Loffhagen	GS, GA	29 April 1978 (aged 25)	1.85 m (6 ft 1 in)
(New Zealand)	Emma Moynihan			–
(New Zealand)	Lesley Nicol (c)	WD, C	9 May 1973 (aged 30)	1.78 m (5 ft 10 in)
(New Zealand)	Kylie Smith			–
(New Zealand)	Debbie Telfer			–
(New Zealand)	Wendy Telfer	WD, C, WA	15 October 1984 (aged 19)	1.74 m (5 ft 9 in)
(New Zealand)	Reinga Te Huia	WD, C	(aged 29)	–

Head coach

- (New Zealand) Robyn Broughton

Assistant coach

- (New Zealand) Tania Dalton^{1}

Manager: Jackie Barron
Physiotherapist:
Neil Familton
Sports Science:
Steve Jackson
Marketing & Events Manager:
Liz McDonald
Sponsorship Manager:
Jan Spriggs

Notes

- (c) – Captain
- (cc) – Co-captain
- (vc) – Vice-captain
- – Injury / maternity leave
- (TRP) – Temporary Replacement Player

Notes

- ^1 In the Round 2 match against Capital Shakers, in the third quarter, Tania Dalton suffered an anterior cruciate ligament injury in her right knee. She subsequently missed the rest of the season. However, she remained with the team as an assistant coach.

== Regular season ==
=== Fixtures and results ===
Round 1

18 April	Southern Sting	76–29	Western Flyers	Stadium Southland
		Report

Round 2

25 April	Capital Shakers	29–61	Southern Sting	Wellington

Round 3

1 May	Southern Sting	62–42	Auckland Diamonds	Stadium Southland
		Report

Round 4

9 May	Southern Sting	58–49	Canterbury Flames	Stadium Southland
	Donna Loffhagen; Natalie Avellino	Report	Belinda Colling; Jodi Te Huna

Round 5

14 May	Southern Sting	57–34	Otago Rebels	Stadium Southland
		Report

Round 6

23 May	Waikato Bay of Plenty Magic	60–63	Southern Sting	Mystery Creek Events Centre
	Irene van Dyk 42/42 (100%); Anna Senio 18/20 (90%)	Report	Donna Loffhagen 42/43 (98%); Natalie Avellino 21/27 (78%)

Round 7

30 May	Northern Force	60–48	Southern Sting	North Shore Events Centre
		Report

== Finals series ==
=== Major semi-final ===
4 June	Southern Sting	55–52	Canterbury Flames	Stadium Southland
4 June	Scoring by quarter: 16–13, 28–30, 43–41, 55–52			Stadium Southland
4 June	Donna Loffhagen 33/36 (92%); Natalie Avellino 22/30 (73%)		Belinda Colling 30/31 (97%); Jodi Te Huna 22/28 (79%)	Stadium Southland

=== Grand final ===
18 June	Southern Sting	63–55	Canterbury Flames	Stadium Southland
18 June	Scoring by quarter: 17–13, 35–25, 52–41, 63–55			Stadium Southland

== Gallery ==
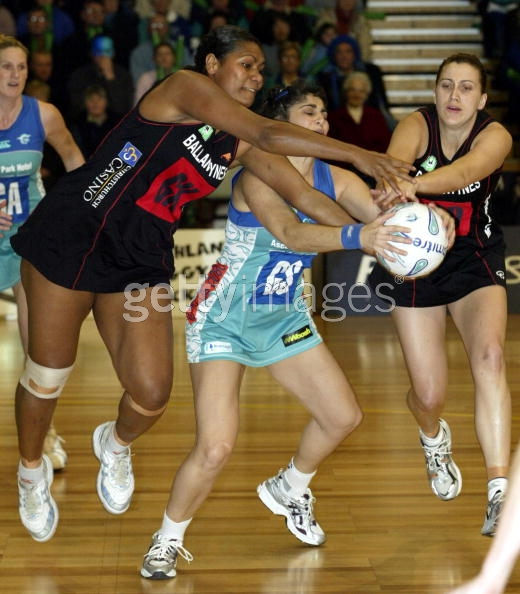
18 June 2004: Natalie Avellino (centre) playing for Southern Sting against Canterbury Flames in the 2004 National Bank Cup final at Stadium Southland. She competes with Flames players Vilimaina Davu (left) and Peta Stephens.
