= 2003 Southern Sting season =

Southern Sting season

Southern Sting
- 2003 season
- Head coach: Robyn Broughton
- Manager: Kate Mackintosh
- Captain: Lesley Nicol
- Main venue: Stadium Southland

Season results
- Wins–losses: 9–1
- Season placing: 1st
- Team colours

Southern Sting seasons
- ← 2002 2004 →

The 2003 Southern Sting season saw the Southern Sting netball team compete in the 2003 National Bank Cup league season. With a team coached by Robyn Broughton, captained by Lesley Nicol and featuring Tania Dalton, Adine Harper, Donna Loffhagen and Wendy Telfer, Sting won their fifth consecutive league title. In the semi-final, they defeated Otago Rebels 56–43. In the grand final, they defeated Northern Force 51–49. It was the first time in the history of the league that it featured a South Island v North Island final.

== Players ==
=== Player movements ===
Gains and losses
▲ Gains	▼ Losses
Jenny Ferguson (Otago Rebels); Kate Lundy; Emma Moynihan; Gemma Russell; Anna Veronese^{1} (Canterbury Flames); Debbie Telfer	Reinga Bloxham; Kirsty Broughton (retirement); Bernice Mene (retirement); Debbie Munro; Kate Newson; Kylie Young

=== 2003 roster ===
2003 Southern Sting roster
Players
Coaching staff

Nat.	Name	Position(s)	DoB	Height
(New Zealand)	Tania Dalton	GS, GA	26 November 1971 (aged 31)	1.84 m (6 ft 0 in)
(New Zealand)	Jenny Ferguson	GD, WD	(aged 24)	1.82 m (6 ft 0 in)
(New Zealand)	Adine Harper	WA, C, GA	8 June 1979 (aged 23)	1.76 m (5 ft 9 in)
(New Zealand)	Megan Hutton	GK	26 March 1976 (aged 27)	1.87 m (6 ft 2 in)
(New Zealand)	Donna Loffhagen	GS, GA	29 April 1978 (aged 24)	1.85 m (6 ft 1 in)
(New Zealand)	Kate Lundy			–
(New Zealand)	Emma Moynihan			–
(New Zealand)	Lesley Nicol (c)	WD, C	9 May 1973 (aged 29)	1.78 m (5 ft 10 in)
(New Zealand)	Gemma Russell			–
(New Zealand)	Jo Tapper			–
(New Zealand)	Debbie Telfer			–
(New Zealand)	Wendy Telfer	WD, C, WA	15 October 1984 (aged 18)	1.74 m (5 ft 9 in)
(New Zealand)	Anna Veronese^{1} (injured)	GK, GD, WD	20 November 1978 (aged 24)	1.84 m (6 ft 0 in)

Head coach

- (New Zealand) Robyn Broughton

Manager: Kate Mackintosh
Physiotherapist:
Neil Familton and
Victoria O'Connell
Sports Science:
Steve Jackson
Marketing & Events Manager:
Liz McDonald
Sponsorship Manager:
Karen Brown
Office Administrator:
Judy Fleck

Notes

- (c) – Captain
- (cc) – Co-captain
- (vc) – Vice-captain
- – Injury / maternity leave
- (TRP) – Temporary Replacement Player

Notes

- ^1 Anna Veronese was signed as replacement for Bernice Mene but she found she was pregnant in January 2003.

== Regular season ==
=== Fixtures and results ===
Round 1

29 March	Southern Sting	80–29	Counties Manukau Cometz	Stadium Southland
		Report

Round 2

6 April	Otago Rebels	50–48	Southern Sting	Edgar Centre

Round 3

11 April	Southern Sting	67–53	Waikato Bay of Plenty Magic	Stadium Southland
	Donna Loffhagen 35/38 (92%); Tania Dalton 32/34 (94%)	Report	Irene van Dyk 44/48 (92%) ??

Round 4

13 April	Southern Sting	53–49	Northern Force	Stadium Southland
		Report

Round 5

17 April	Auckland Diamonds	44–58	Southern Sting	Auckland
		Report	Donna Loffhagen 29/30 (97%)

Round 6

25 April	Canterbury Flames	51–60	Southern Sting	Christchurch

Round 7

27 April	Western Flyers	42–80	Southern Sting	New Plymouth
		Report

Round 8

4 May	Southern Sting	77–44	Capital Shakers	Stadium Southland

Round 9

Southern Sting received a bye.

== Finals series ==
=== Semi-final ===
16 May	Southern Sting	56–43	Otago Rebels	Stadium Southland; Attendance: 4,000
16 May	Scoring by quarter: 15–9, 30–20, 41–29, 56–43			Stadium Southland; Attendance: 4,000

=== Grand final ===
23 May	Southern Sting	51–49	Northern Force	Stadium Southland; Attendance: 4,100
23 May	Scoring by quarter: 9–14, 25–24, 35–35, 51–49			Stadium Southland; Attendance: 4,100
