= Anna Harrison (netball) =

New Zealand netball international

Anna Harrison MNZM
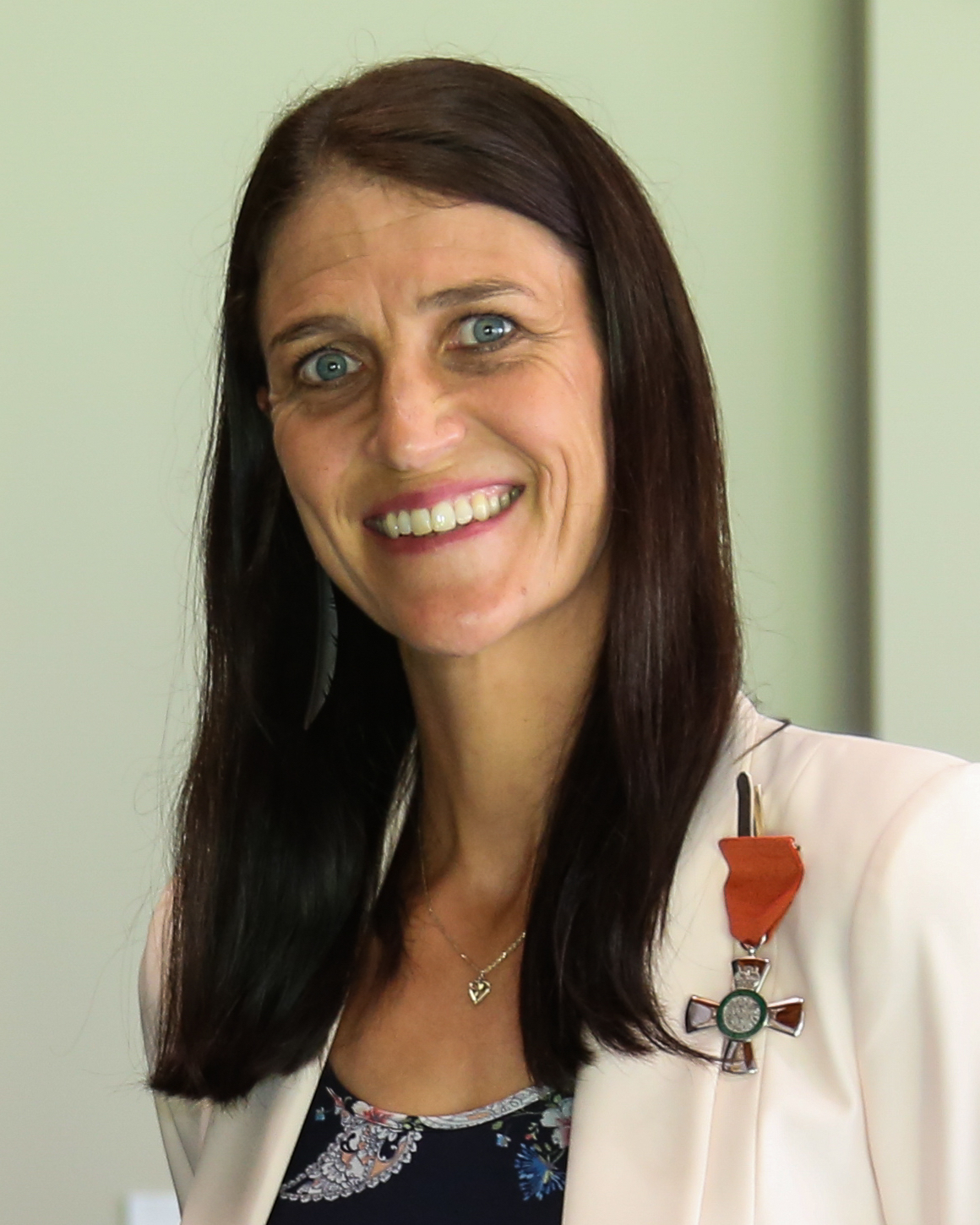
- 13 April 2023: Anna Harrison at Government House, Auckland, after her investiture as a Member of the New Zealand Order of Merit.

Personal information
- Full name: Anna Maree Harrison (Née: Scarlett)
- Born: 15 April 1983 (age 43) Westport, New Zealand
- Height: 1.87 m (6 ft 2 in)
- School: St Margaret's College
- University: University of Otago; Massey University

Netball career
- Playing positions: GK, GD, WD
Years	Club team	Apps
2002–2005	Otago Rebels	
2006–2007	Auckland Diamonds	
2011–2018	Northern Mystics	83
2021–2022	Northern Stars	28
Years	National team	Caps
2002–2017	New Zealand	88
Medal record
Representing New Zealand
World Netball Championships
Gold medal – first place	2003 Kingston	Team
Silver medal – second place	2011 Singapore	Team
Commonwealth Games
Gold medal – first place	2006 Melbourne	Team
Gold medal – first place	2010 Delhi	Team
Silver medal – second place	2014 Glasgow	Team
Fast5 Netball World Series
Gold medal – first place	2012 Auckland	Team
Silver medal – second place	2011 Liverpool	Team

Anna Maree Harrison MNZM (born 15 April 1983), originally known as Anna Scarlett, is a former New Zealand netball international. She was a member of the New Zealand teams that won gold medals at the 2003 World Netball Championships and 2006 and 2010 Commonwealth Games. During the National Bank Cup era, she played for Otago Rebels and Auckland Diamonds. During the ANZ Championship era, she played for Northern Mystics. In 2012, Harrison began using a rugby union lineout-style form of goaltending. The technique subsequently became known as the Harrison Hoist. During the ANZ Premiership era, she played for Mystics and Northern Stars. As well as playing international netball, Harrison also played for the New Zealand women's national volleyball team and represented New Zealand on the FIVB Beach Volleyball World Tour. In 2022, she was included on a list of the 25 best players to feature in netball leagues in New Zealand since 1998. In 2023, Harrison was appointed a Member of the New Zealand Order of Merit, for services to netball and volleyball.

== Early life, family and education ==
Scarlett is the daughter of Ross and Nova Scarlett. She was born in Westport, New Zealand and raised in Karamea on the South Island's West Coast. Her parents own a dairy farm. She attended St Margaret's College, Christchurch. In 2000, while still a student at St Margaret's, she first played for the New Zealand women's national volleyball team. As a schoolgirl she also played beach volleyball and water polo as well as netball. Between 2001 and 2006 she attended the University of Otago where she gained a Bachelor of Physiotherapy. During the 2012 ANZ Championship season, she married Craig Harrison, a sports scientist. Together, they have three children. In 2022 she gained a Diploma of Human Development from Massey University.

== Playing career ==
=== National Bank Cup ===
Between 2002 and 2007, during the National Bank Cup era, Scarlett made 45 appearances for Otago Rebels and Auckland Diamonds. She played for Rebels between 2002 and 2005 and Diamonds between 2006 and 2007. Scarlett was playing for Rebels when she made her senior debut for New Zealand in 2002.

=== Northern Mystics ===
Between 2011 and 2018, Harrison made 83 senior appearances for Northern Mystics, initially in the ANZ Championship and later in the ANZ Premiership. She signed for Mystics ahead of the 2011 season. She was subsequently a member of the 2011 Northern Mystics team that finished as ANZ Championship grand finalists. She was also included in the 2011 ANZ Championship All Star Team.

On 20 May 2012 while playing for Mystics in a 2012 ANZ Championship Round 8 match against Melbourne Vixens, Harrison made several vital blocks while being hoisted rugby union lineout-style by her defensive partners. Harrison was lifted first by Kayla Cullen and then twice in the final quarter by Jessica Moulds. Cullen and Moulds adopted the role of a lineout lifter to hoist Harrison and the move had the desired result in the final quarter when Vixens goal shooter Karyn Howarth's goal-bound shots were twice batted away. Mystics won the match 49–45 and this form of goaltending became known as the Harrison Hoist.

Harrison missed the 2013 and 2015 seasons due to pregnancy. In 2017 and 2018, Harrison served as Mystics captain. In 2017 she co-captained the team with Maria Tutaia. During the 2017 season, Harrison made her 100th senior league appearance. In July 2018, Harrison announced her retirement. On 1 August 2018, she made her last appearance for Mystics in a 2018 ANZ Premiership Round 13 match against Central Pulse.

=== Northern Stars ===
In 2021 and 2022, after coming out of retirement, Harrison made 28 senior appearances for Northern Stars in the ANZ Premiership. Her impression form with Stars resulted in speculation that she could be called up for New Zealand. She was a member of the 2022 Northern Stars team that finished as ANZ Premiership grand finalists. On 7 May 2022, while playing for Stars, Harrison made her 150th senior league appearance in a 2022 Round 9 match against Waikato Bay of Plenty Magic. The 2022 grand final was Harrison's final match for Stars. She finished her career with 156 senior league appearances.

=== New Zealand ===
Between 2002 and 2017, Harrison made 88 senior appearances for New Zealand. She previously represented New Zealand at under-21 level. She also traveled with the New Zealand team to the 2002 Commonwealth Games as a training partner. On 1 November 2002, she made her senior debut for New Zealand during a series against South Africa. She was subsequently a member of the New Zealand teams that won the gold medal at both the 2003 World Netball Championships. and 2006 Commonwealth Games. However, after failing to get selected for the 2007 World Netball Championships, Scarlett retired from netball to focus on qualifying for the beach volleyball tournament at the 2012 Summer Olympics. At the time of her first retirement, Scarlett had made 39 senior appearances for New Zealand.

In 2010, after returning to netball, Scarlett quickly regained her place in the New Zealand team. On 7 August 2010 she made her return against Samoa in the 2010 Taini Jamison Trophy Series. She was subsequently a member of the New Zealand teams that won the gold medal at the 2010 Commonwealth Games and the silver medal at the 2011 World Netball Championships.

On 10 November 2012, Harrison used the Harrison Hoist technique while playing for New Zealand against England during the 2012 Fast5 Netball World Series. After representing New Zealand at the 2014 Commonwealth Games, Harrison missed the 2015 season due to pregnancy. She then missed the 2016 Netball Quad Series and the 2016 Taini Jamison Trophy Series with a calf injury. However she returned for the 2016 Constellation Cup. In June 2017, Harrison announced her retirement from international netball. In April 2022, she was one of 25 New Zealand internationals included on a list of the best players to feature in netball leagues in New Zealand since 1998.

Tournaments	Place
2003 World Netball Championships	1st place, gold medalist(s)
2006 Commonwealth Games	1st place, gold medalist(s)
2010 Taini Jamison Trophy Series	1st
2010 Constellation Cup	2nd
2010 Commonwealth Games	1st place, gold medalist(s)
2011 World Netball Championships	2nd place, silver medalist(s)
2011 Constellation Cup	2nd
2011 Taini Jamison Trophy Series	1st
2011 World Netball Series	2nd place, silver medalist(s)
2012 Constellation Cup	1st
2012 Netball Quad Series	2nd
2012 Fast5 Netball World Series	1st place, gold medalist(s)
2014 Commonwealth Games	2nd place, silver medalist(s)
2016 Constellation Cup	2nd
2017 Netball Quad Series (January/February)	2nd

== Statistics ==
Season	Team	G/A	GA	RB	CPR	FD	IC	DF	PN	TO	MP
2011	Mystics	0/0	1	33	61	?	31	?	224	19	15
2012	Mystics	0/0									
2013	Mystics	0/0	0	0	0	0	0	0	0	0	0
2014	Mystics	0/0									
2015	Mystics	0/0	0	0	0	0	0	0	0	0	0
2016	Mystics	0/0									
2017	Mystics	0/0	?	21	33	?	43	90	194	11	15
2018	Mystics	0/0	?	12	30	?	35	103	166	17	15
2021	Stars	0/0	1	14	33	2	39	66	226	11	15
2022	Stars	0/0	0	8	9	0	24	65	150	8	13
Career											

Notes

- ^1 Between 2002 and 2007, Harrison made 45 National Bank Cup appearances for Otago Rebels and Auckland Diamonds.
- ^2 Between 2011 and 2016, Harrison made 53 ANZ Championship appearances for Northern Mystics.
- ^3 Harrison missed the 2013 and 2015 seasons due to pregnancy.
- ^4 Harrison finished her career with 156 senior league appearances.

== Beach volleyball ==
Between 2008 and 2010, together with Susan Blundell, Scarlett represented New Zealand on the FIVB Beach Volleyball World Tour. During this time they attempted to qualify for the beach volleyball tournament at the 2012 Summer Olympics. Scarlett used her netball connections to get the pair much need sponsorship. For a time they were sponsored by LG Electronics who also sponsored Northern Mystics. In 2010, she retired from the FIVB Beach Volleyball World Tour and returned to netball. Between 2000 and 2010 and again since 2021, Scarlett also competed on the New Zealand beach volleyball tour. In 2009 and 2010, Scarlett and Susan Blundell were tour champions. During her beach volleyball career, Scarlett spoke out about how "a skilful game" is marketed as "women running around in bikinis."

== Later career ==
=== Coach ===
In 2019, Harrison served as a specialist coach with Northern Marvels in the National Netball League.

=== Commentator ===
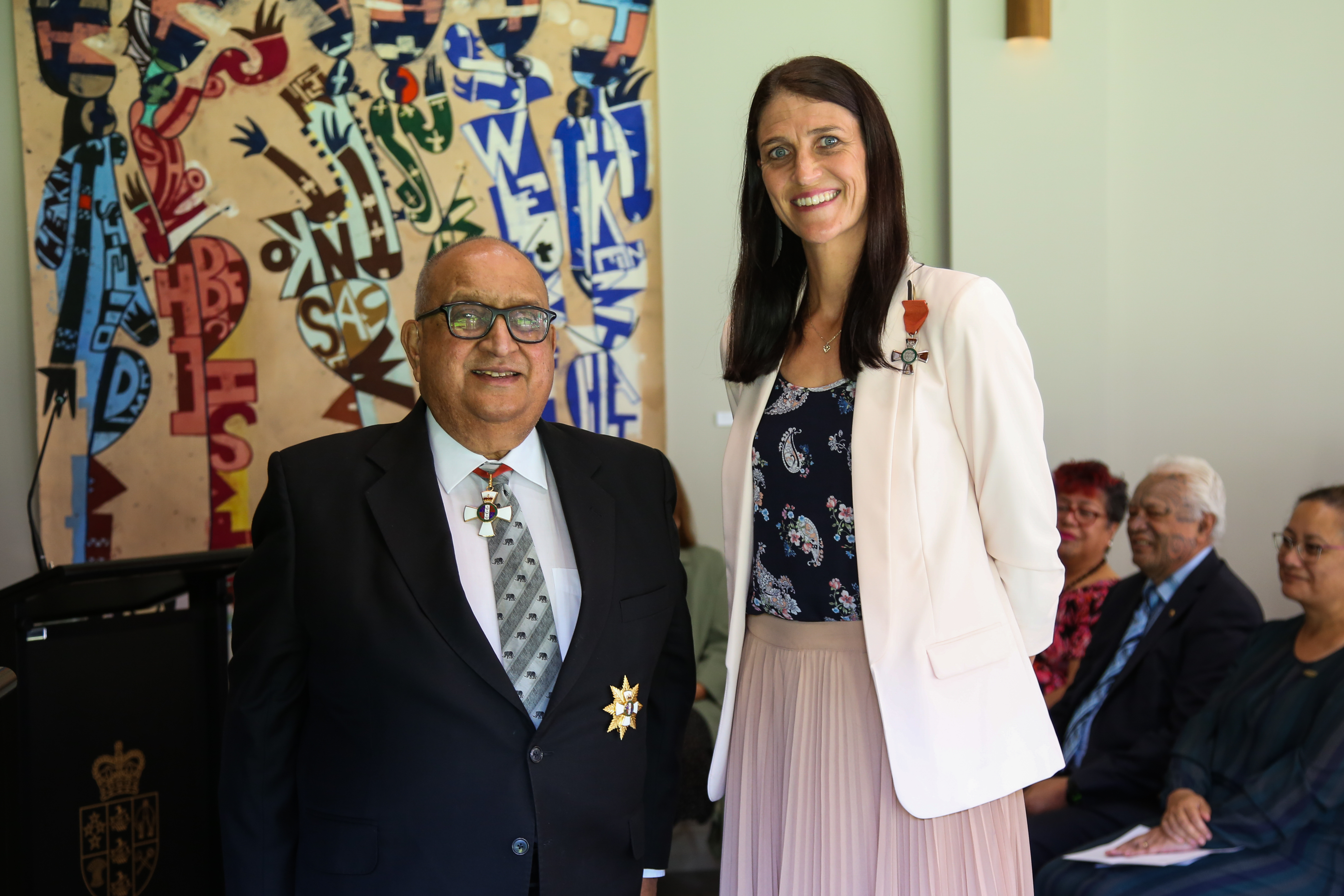
13 April 2023: Anna Harrison at Government House, Auckland, after her investiture as a Member of the New Zealand Order of Merit by the former Governor-General of New Zealand, Sir Anand Satyanand.

Since 2019, Harrison has worked as a netball commentator for Sky Sport (New Zealand). She was a member of their commentary team for the 2019 and 2020 ANZ Premiership seasons and for the 2019 Netball World Cup before coming out of retirement to play for Northern Stars.

=== MNZM ===
In the 2023 New Year Honours, Harrison was appointed a Member of the New Zealand Order of Merit, for services to netball and volleyball. Together with Leigh Gibbs and Kereyn Smith, she was one of several New Zealand netball people to receive an honour. On 13 April 2023 she attended an investiture ceremony at Government House, Auckland where she was presented with the honour by the former Governor-General of New Zealand, Sir Anand Satyanand.

== Honours ==
New Zealand

- World Netball Championships
  - Winners: 2003
  - Runners Up: 2011
- Commonwealth Games
  - Winners: 2006, 2010
  - Runners Up: 2014
- Constellation Cup
  - Winners: 2012
- Taini Jamison Trophy
  - Winners: 2010, 2011
- Fast5 Netball World Series
  - Winners: 2012
  - Runners Up: 2011
- Netball Quad Series
  - Runners Up: 2012

Northern Mystics

- ANZ Championship
  - Runners Up: 2011

Northern Stars

- ANZ Premiership
  - Runners Up: 2022

Individual Awards

Year	Award
2011	ANZ Championship All Star Team
2023	Member of the New Zealand Order of Merit
