= Hannah Broederlow =

New Zealand netball player

Personal information
- Born: 8 March 1988 (age 38) Palmerston North, New Zealand
- Height: 1.79 m (5 ft 10 1/2 in)
- School: Palmerston North Girls' High School
- University: University of Otago

Netball career
- Playing positions: GD, WD, GK
Years	Club team	Apps
2007	Otago Rebels	
2009	Central Pulse	
Years	National team	Caps
2004–05	New Zealand Secondary Schools	
2006–09	New Zealand U21	
- Updated on 3 July 2009

Hannah Broederlow (born 8 March 1988 in Palmerston North, New Zealand) is a New Zealand netball player. Broederlow attended Palmerston North Girls' High School before continuing her studies at the University of Otago. During her high school years she played in the New Zealand Secondary Schools team (2004–05). She has played with the New Zealand U21 netball team since 2006, and was elevated to the New Zealand A squad in 2008. Broederlow was signed in 2007 to play with the Otago Rebels in the National Bank Cup. She was overlooked the next year for a spot in the inaugural ANZ Championship, but later received a callup from Yvette McCausland-Durie to play with the Central Pulse in 2009. Broederlow was also named in the New Zealand U21 team to compete at the 2009 World Youth Netball Championships in the Cook Islands.
