= Grace Kara =

New Zealand netball player

Personal information
- Born: Grace Rasmussen; 18 March 1988 (age 38) Auckland, New Zealand
- Height: 1.77 m (5 ft 10 in)
- Spouse: Mark Kara (m. 2017)
- Relatives: Rachel Rasmussen (sister); Roma Rasmussen (sister); Ann Helen Nu'uali'itia (sister)

Netball career
- Playing positions: WA, C, GA
| Years | Club team | Apps |
| 2005–07 | Auckland Diamonds | |
| 2008–2013 | Northern Mystics | 39 |
| 2014–2017 | Waikato Bay of Plenty Magic | |
| 2017–2018 | Northern Stars | |
| Years | National team | Caps |
| 2004–09 | New Zealand U21 | |
| 2010–2019 | Silver Ferns | 63 |
Medal record
Representing New Zealand
Netball World Cup
| Silver medal – second place | 2015 Sydney | Netball |
Commonwealth Games
| Gold medal – first place | 2010 Delhi | Netball |
World Netball Series
| Gold medal – first place | 2010 Liverpool | Fastnet |
- Updated on 15 December 2017

Grace Kara (née Rasmussen; born 18 March 1988 in Auckland, New Zealand) is a former New Zealand netball player of Samoan descent. Kara played in the National Bank Cup for the Auckland Diamonds from 2005 to 2007. She continued playing in Auckland for the Northern Mystics in the ANZ Championship, starting in 2008. She is the younger sister of fellow Mystics player Rachel Rasmussen and she is also the older sister of Ann-Helen Rasmussen.

Kara was a member of the New Zealand U21 team from 2004 to 2009, winning gold (2005) and silver (2009) medals at the World Youth National Championships. In 2009, she travelled with the senior national team, the Silver Ferns, as a member of their extended training squad. Kara earned a place in the Silver Ferns lineup the following year, making her debut against Samoa. She later travelled to Delhi for the 2010 Commonwealth Games, and was named in the 2010 Fastnet Ferns for the World Netball Series.

She suffered a season ending ACL injury in 2011, which left her out of the end of year squad. She made the squad again for the 2012–13 season, and was named in the twelve for the Australian leg of the 2012 Quad Series, but a stress fracture left her unable to take part.

In 2017 she joined Northern Stars where she almost immediately became the captain of the ANZ Premiership team. In 2018 she announced that she is pregnant.
