= Otago Rebels =

Defunct New Zealand netball team

- Founded: 1998; 28 years ago
- Disbanded: 2007; 19 years ago
- Based in: Dunedin
- Region: Otago
- Home venue: Edgar Centre
- League: Coca-Cola Cup/National Bank Cup
Uniform

Otago Rebels are a former New Zealand netball team that were based in Dunedin. Between 1998 and 2007, Rebels played in the Coca-Cola Cup/National Bank Cup league. Rebels played in two grand finals. In 1998 they were the league's inaugural champions. In 1999 they were runners up. Ahead of the 2008 season, Rebels merged with Southern Sting to form the new ANZ Championship team, Southern Steel.

== History ==
=== Inaugural champions ===
In 1998, together with Auckland Diamonds, Bay of Plenty Magic, Capital Shakers, Canterbury Flames, Counties Manukau Cometz, Northern Force, Southern Sting, Waikato Wildcats and Western Flyers, Rebels were founding members of the Coca-Cola Cup/National Bank Cup league. With a team coached by Georgie Salter, captained by Lesley Nicol and featuring Belinda Blair, Belinda Colling, Victoria Edward, Adine Harper, Anna Rowberry and Jo Steed, Rebels finished the inaugural 1998 season as champions. In the grand-final they defeated Southern Sting 57–50. In 1999, Rebels were again grand finalists. However, this time they lost 63–54 to Sting.

=== Merger ===
Ahead of the 2008 season, Rebels merged with Southern Sting to form the new ANZ Championship team, Southern Steel. Katrina Grant, Jessica Tuki and Debbie White, who were members of the 2007 Otago Rebels squad were all included in the inaugural 2008 Southern Steel team.

== Stats ==
Season	Position	Won	Drawn	Lost
1998	1st			
1999	2nd			
2000	5th			
2001	8th			
2002	5th			
2003	4th			
2004	6th			
2005	5th			
2006	7th			
2007	6th			

Winners Runners Up

== Grand finals ==
=== Coca-Cola Cup ===
Season	Winners	Score	Runners up	Venue
1998	Otago Rebels	57–50	Southern Sting	Edgar Centre
1999	Southern Sting	63–54	Otago Rebels	Edgar Centre

== Notable former players ==
=== Internationals ===
New Zealand

- Belinda Blair
- Belinda Colling
- Victoria Edward
- Katrina Grant
- Adine Harper
- Angela Mitchell
- Lesley Nicol
- Anna Rowberry
- Anna Scarlett
- Jo Steed
- Jodi Te Huna
- Anna Thompson
- Jessica Tuki
- Debbie White

Australia

- Demelza Fellowes

England

- Jo Steed

=== ANZ Championship players ===
- Stephanie Bond
- Hannah Broederlow
- Jenny Ferguson
- Phillipa Finch
- Kahurangi Waititi
- Angelina Yates

=== Others ===
- Alison Shanks, New Zealand track cyclist

=== Captains ===
	Years
Lesley Nicol	1998
Megan Parke	2001
Janine Southby	2002–2003
Debbie White	2004
Anna Scarlett	2004
Angela Mitchell	2005
Jodi Te Huna	2007

== Coaches ==
=== Head coaches ===
Coach	Years
Georgie Salter	1998–2000
Lois Muir	2001–2005
Janine Southby	2006–2007

=== Assistant coaches ===
Coach	Years
Janine Southby	2004–2005

== Honours ==
- Coca-Cola Cup
  - Winners: 1998
  - Runners Up: 1999

== Gallery ==
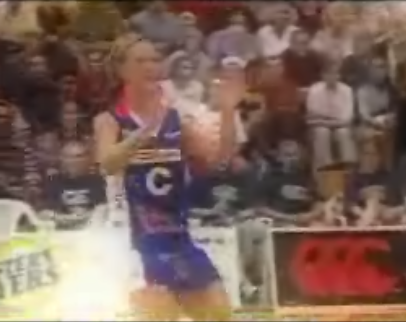
Anna Rowberry was a member of the 1998 Otago Rebels team that were inaugural Coca-Cola Cup champions
