= Counties Manukau Cometz =

Defunct New Zealand netball team

- Founded: 1998; 28 years ago
- Disbanded: 2003; 23 years ago
- Based in: Papatoetoe
- Region: Counties Manukau/Thames Valley
- Home venue: Allan Brewster Stadium
- League: Coca-Cola Cup/National Bank Cup
Uniform
Uniform

Counties Manukau Cometz, are a former New Zealand netball team that were based in Papatoetoe, Auckland. Cometz represented the Counties Manukau/Thames Valley regions of South Auckland and, as a result, were also known as CMTV Cometz. Between 1998 and 2003, they played in the Coca-Cola Cup/National Bank Cup league.

== History ==
=== Inaugural season ===
In 1998, together with Auckland Diamonds, Bay of Plenty Magic, Capital Shakers, Canterbury Flames, Northern Force, Otago Rebels, Waikato Wildcats, Southern Sting and Western Flyers, Cometz were founding members of the Coca-Cola Cup/National Bank Cup league. Cometz represented the Counties Manukau/Thames Valley regions of South Auckland and, as a result, were also known as CMTV Cometz. Their first head coach was future New Zealand national netball team head coach Ruth Aitken.

=== Six seasons ===
Between 1998 and 2003, Cometz played in the Coca-Cola Cup/National Bank Cup league. Together with Auckland Diamonds and Northern Force, Cometz were one of three teams from the Auckland Region to play in the league. Due to poor ticket sales, the three teams faced early suggestions that they should merge. Cometz also found themselves competing for players against Diamonds, Force and Waikato Bay of Plenty Magic. Cometz enjoyed a local rivalry with Diamonds. In the six seasons the teams played against each other, Diamonds won four and Cometz won two.

=== Demise ===
After losing 80–29 to Southern Sting in a 2003 Round 1 match, Cometz began to face calls for them to drop out of the league. In May 2003, following an independent report on the league by Price Waterhouse Coopers, Netball New Zealand confirmed that Cometz would be dropped from the league.

=== Legacy ===
In 2017 the Comets name was revived when Northern Comets began competing in the National Netball League. Comets are effectively the reserve team of Northern Stars, who represent South Auckland in the ANZ Premiership. During the 2022 ANZ Premiership season, Stars paid tribute to Counties Manukau Cometz by wearing a replica of their famous dress during their Heritage Round match against Waikato Bay of Plenty Magic.

== Home venues ==
Cometz played the majority of their home matches at Papatoetoe's Allan Brewster Stadium.

== Notable former players ==
=== Internationals ===
New Zealand

- Temepara George
- Carron Jerram
- Gael Nagaiya
- Ana Noovao
- Lorna Suafoa

Samoa

- Lorna Suafoa

Cook Islands

- Ana Noovao

=== ANZ Premiership coaches ===
- Yvette McCausland-Durie
- Mary-Jane Araroa

=== Others ===
- Cushla Lichtwark, New Zealand women's football international

=== Captains ===
	Years
Gael Nagaiya	1999
Temepara George	2000
Roxanne Chatterton	2003
Leonie Matoe	2003

== Coaches ==
=== Head coaches ===
Coach	Years
Ruth Aitken	1998–2000
Tabitha Beaumont	2001
Jan Lundon	2002
Ana Noovao	2003

=== Assistant coaches ===
Coach	Years
Gael Nagaiya	2000
