= Debbie White (netball) =

New Zealand netball player

Personal information
- Born: 23 April 1978 (age 48) Balclutha, New Zealand
- Occupation: Teacher
- Height: 1.81 m (5 ft 11 in)

Netball career
- Playing positions: WD, GD, C
Years	Club team	Apps
1999–2007	Otago Rebels	
2008	Southern Steel	
2009	Northern Mystics	
Years	National team	Caps
2003–04	New Zealand A	
2005–07	Silver Ferns	1
- Updated on 21 September 2010

Debbie White (born 23 April 1978 in Balclutha, New Zealand) is a New Zealand netball player. White played domestic netball for the Otago Rebels in the National Bank Cup from 1999 to 2007, becoming the franchise's most capped player. In 2005, she gained selection for the New Zealand national squad, the Silver Ferns, and debuted for the team in 2006 against Australia. With the start of the ANZ Championship in 2008, White signed up with the Southern Steel. For the 2009 season, she transferred the Northern Mystics.
