= Stephanie Bond (netball) =

New Zealand netball player

Personal information
- Born: 16 May 1981 (age 45) Dargaville, New Zealand
- Occupation: Solicitor
- Height: 1.83 m (6 ft 0 in)

Netball career
- Playing positions: WD, GD
Years	Club team	Apps
2001–2005	Otago Rebels	
2006–2007	Auckland Diamonds	
2008–2009	Northern Mystics	
2012	Southern Steel	

Stephanie Bond (born 16 May 1981) is a New Zealand player. She played for the Northern Mystics in the 2008 and 2009 ANZ Championship seasons. but was not signed for the 2010 season, due to time restraints with her law career.

Prior to the ANZ Championship, Bond spent time with both the Auckland Diamonds (2006–2007) and Otago Rebels (2001–2005) in the National Bank Cup.

In 2012, she was called up into the Southern Steel for a game as cover for the injured Sheryl Scanlan.
