= Phillipa Finch =

New Zealand netball player

Personal information
- Full name: Phillipa Finch (Née: Duncan)
- Born: 24 December 1981 (age 44) Balclutha, New Zealand
- Occupation: teacher at Te Koromiko Swannanoa School
- Height: 1.71 m (5 ft 7 in)
- University: Otago

Netball career
- Playing positions: WD, C, WA
Years	Club team	Apps
2001–2007	Otago Rebels	
2008–present	Canterbury Tactix	
- Updated on 18 March 2010

Phillipa Finch (née Duncan; born 24 December 1981 in Balclutha, New Zealand) is a New Zealand netball player. Finch has been added to the Southern Steel squad for the 2012 ANZ Championship season to replace the pregnant Wendy Frew. She previously played with the Otago Rebels in the National Bank Cup from 2001. With the start of the ANZ Championship, Finch was signed with the Canterbury Tactix, although she continued to play provincial netball with Otago. Finch was also included in the New Zealand Accelerant Squad, which replaced the New Zealand A netball team in 2008.
