= Janine Southby =

Personal information
- Full name: Janine Southby (Née: Brown)
- Occupations: Coach & P.E Teacher
- Spouse: Roger
- Children: Grace, Ella
- Relative: Jodi Brown (sister-in-law)

Netball career
- Playing positions: C, WA
Years	Club team	Apps
1997–2001	Western Flyers	
2002–2003	Otago Rebels	
Coaching career
- Years: Team
- 2004–2005: Otago Rebels (Assistant coach)
- 2006–2007: Otago Rebels (Coach)
- 2010–present: New Zealand u/21 squad (Coach)
- 2011–2014: Southern Steel (Co-coach)
- 2015–2018: Silver Ferns (Coach)
- Updated on 2011-05-23

Janine Southby Brown is a retired New Zealand netball player who then coached the national Silver Ferns netball team. She was also the coach of the Southern Steel in the ANZ Championship. Southby played for the Western Flyers in the National Bank Cup competition from 1997 to 2001, before transferring to the Dunedin-based Otago Rebels in 2002. In 2015, Southby was given the role as head coach for the New Zealand netball team the Silver Ferns. Southby had resigned on July 20, 2018, where the independent review found fault in Southby's coaching style.

== Coaching ==
Southby retired from netball after the 2003 season and became the Rebels assistant coach for 2004 and 2005, working under Lois Muir.

In 2006 Southby was announced the new coach of the Rebels franchise, and held that position until the National Bank Cup made way for the new ANZ Championship in 2008.

Southby applied for the new coaching role of the Southern Steel, an amalgamation of the championship-winning Southern Sting and Rebels. She was unsuccessful, with Sting coach Robyn Broughton winning the position and opting to select former Silver Fern Donna Wilkins as her assistant.

Southby continued her coaching with the Otago provincial side from 2008, and was later announced as coach of the New Zealand under 21 squad in 2010. Southby coached the national under 21 side for four years, ending in September 2013 when her side won the World Youth Cup in Glasgow. She is the current coach of the national senior Fast5 team.

== Southern Steel ==
After a poor season in the ANZ Championship, the Southern Steel advertised the franchise's coaching role for the 2012 season. Broughton, who had held the role for the previous 14 seasons, decided against reapplying. On 20 May, Southby – along with former Australian international and Southland coach Natalie Avellino – were confirmed as the team's new co-coaches.

After a franchise review by Steel chief executive David Bannister in late 2012, Southby was promoted to head coach for the 2013 season. Avellino was reverted to an assistant coaching role. Midway through the 2013 season, Avellino was controversially axed by the franchise after a reported fall out between the coaches. The franchise described the situation as "untenable" and that the coaching pair had "different coaching philosophies".

Southby will return as coach for the Southern Steel in the 2014 season, with the rest of her management staff yet to be announced.

== Silver Ferns Coach (2015–2018) ==
Appointed the role in November 2015, Southby is a product of the Netball New Zealand High Performance Coach pathway, that assisted her leading the NZ U/21s team to gold at the World Youth Netball Cup, in 2013 against Australia in the final.

As coach of the ferns she won her first game, with Katrina Grant as team captain against England Roses in the Netball Quad Series (NZL-65—ENG-39), at Vector Arena, in Auckland In 2016, the ferns also won one of the four matches in the Constellation Cup annually played between, Australia, the second match the Ferns won by 2 points (53 to Australian Diamonds 51), they ended losing the cup to lose the next two matches.

On July 20, 2018, silver ferns coach Janine Southby had resigned in the wake of Netball New Zealand's independent review of the team's disastrous Commonwealth Games campaign, in which they did not even collect a medal.
