= Ann Helen Nu'uali'itia =

Samoan netball player

Personal information
- Born: 29 May 1990 (age 36) Auckland, New Zealand
- Occupation: netball player
- Height: 1.75 m (5 ft 9 in)
- Relatives: Rachel Rasmussen (sister); Grace Kara (sister); Roma Rasmussen (sister)
- University: University of Auckland

Netball career
- Playing positions: wing attack, centre
Years	National team	Caps
- Samoa
- New Zealand

Ann Helen Nu'uali'itia also known as Ann-Helen Rasmussen née Rasmussen (born 29 May 1990) is a Samoan and New Zealand netball player of Samoan descent who represents both Samoa and New Zealand internationally and plays in the positions of wing attack and centre. She made her maiden World Cup appearance representing Samoa at the 2019 Netball World Cup.

Her elder sisters Rachel Rasmussen, Grace Rasmussen and Rona Rasmussen are all netball players who have represented both New Zealand and Samoa in international level.
