= Jessica Clark =

Jessica Clark(e) may refer to:

- Jessica Clark (actress) (born 1985), British model and actress
- Jessica Clarke (footballer), English footballer
- Jessica Clarke (model)
- Jessica G. L. Clarke, American lawyer
