= Harrison Hoist =

Form of goaltending in netball

The Harrison Hoist, also known as The Chairlift, is a form of goaltending in netball where one defender lifts another defender, rugby union lineout-style, in order to catch the ball and prevent a goal scoring opportunity. It was named after Anna Harrison who completed the move successfully on 20 May 2012 while playing for Northern Mystics in a 2012 ANZ Championship Round 8 match against Melbourne Vixens. According to Netball Australia, Christine Stanton also performed the move during the 1970s. Singapore performed a similar move, known as the Lion Dance Lift, during a 2011 World Netball Championships match against Sri Lanka.

== History ==
=== Christine Stanton ===
Following Anna Harrison's successful performance of the technique, Netball Australia declared that Christine Stanton had performed the move during the 1970s. Stanton represented Australia at the Summer Olympics as a high jumper.

=== Lion Dance Lift ===
On 8 July 2011, during a 2011 World Netball Championships match between Singapore and Sri Lanka, Singapore, whose tallest defender was 1.7 m, devised a strategy to defend against the 2.08 m Tharjini Sivalingam. In the fourth quarter, the goal defender, Lin Qingyi, was lifted by the goal keeper, Premila Hirubalan, in an attempt to intercept the ball before it got to Sivalingam. Sivalingam still managed to score 60 goals as she helped Sri Lanka win 62–51. However, when the same two teams met in the 2009 Asian Netball Championships final, Sri Lanka had won by the greater margin of 77–48. In a May 2022 interview with Sky Sport (New Zealand), Anna Harrison credits Singapore with been the inspiration behind Northern Mystics trying the move.

=== 2012 ANZ Championship ===
On 20 May 2012 while playing for Northern Mystics in a 2012 ANZ Championship Round 8 match against Melbourne Vixens, Anna Harrison made several vital blocks while being hoisted rugby union lineout-style by her defensive partners. Harrison was lifted first by Kayla Cullen and then twice in the final quarter by Jessica Moulds. Mystics won the match 49–45. Cullen and Moulds adopted the role of a lineout lifter to hoist Harrison and the move had the desired result in the final quarter when Vixens goal shooter Karyn Howarth's goal-bound shots were twice batted away. Mystics coach, Debbie Fuller reluctantly claimed ownership of the innovation, adding that her defenders and skills coach, Jason Gregory, had also had input. Fuller discussed her idea with umpires in both Australia and New Zealand who confirmed the move was legal. Vixens captain and defender, Bianca Chatfield had no issue with the manoeuvre and declared, "I loved it. As a defender you are always trying to be so creative ... it was just awesome for them to be able to do that." She also said that both Vixens and Australia had experimented with a similar tactic but had not been able to perfect it.

The technique was initially referred to by several names, including the Chairlift, the Lineout Lift and the Scarlett Skylift, before becoming known as the Harrison Hoist. Mystics initially referred to the move as The Cheer-Lift as it was partly inspired by cheerleading lifts. It drew comparisons with the rugby union lineout and goaltending in basketball. The move had been months in planning and had been practiced by Mystics for four weeks behind closed doors in training. It was originally planned to be implemented in the playoffs. However, Fuller, thinking a playoff place was not certain, decided to unveil it against Vixens. Harrison's physique and previous experience as a beach volleyball player helped Fuller come up with the idea to use the move. Dawn Jones, the chair of the International Federation of Netball Associations match officials panel, speaking on behalf of Netball New Zealand, confirmed the move was legal.

=== Other attempts ===
On 10 November 2012, Anna Harrison again used the technique while playing for New Zealand against England during the 2012 Fast5 Netball World Series. Kate Shimmin, Jane Watson, Sulu Tone-Fitzpatrick, Katrina Grant and Maddy Turner have all attempted the move with varied degrees of success.
