= Stephanie Bond =

Stephanie Bond may refer to:

- Stephanie Bond (author) (born 1965), American author
- Stephanie Bond (netball) (born 1981), New Zealand netball player
