= Rachel Rasmussen =

New Zealand and Samoan netball player

Personal information
- Born: 5 June 1984 (age 42) Auckland, New Zealand
- Height: 1.83 m (6 ft 0 in)
- Relative: Grace Rasmussen (sister)
- School: Avondale College

Netball career
- Playing positions: GK, GD
Years	Club team	Apps
2000–07	Auckland Diamonds	
2008–09	Northern Mystics	26
2010	Central Pulse (TRP)	
2011	Northern Mystics	
Years	National team	Caps
2003, 2019	Samoa	
2010	New Zealand	
Medal record
Representing New Zealand
World Netball Series
Gold medal – first place	2010 Liverpool	Fastnet
- Updated on 4 April 2020

Rachel Rasmussen (born 5 June 1984 in Auckland, New Zealand) is a New Zealand netball player of Samoan descent who plays in the position of goal defense and goal keeper. She has represented both New Zealand and Samoa at the international level. Rasmussen was signed with the Auckland Diamonds in the Coca-Cola Cup (later the National Bank Cup) in 2000, continuing with the side until the competition's end in 2007. With the start of the ANZ Championship in 2008, she remained in Auckland with the new Northern Mystics side, alongside her sister Grace. She played two years with the Mystics, but was not signed on for 2010. However, she received a callup to the Wellington-based Central Pulse as a temporary replacement player for injured defender Katrina Grant.

In international netball, Rasmussen played with New Zealand U21 at the World Youth Netball Championships, winning silver in 2000 and gold in 2005. She has also represented Samoa at international level, playing in the 2003 Netball World Championships. She was again selected to represent New Zealand at the 2010 World Netball Series with younger sister Grace.

She has signed on with the Southern Steel for the 2013 season.

She again represented Samoa at the 2019 Netball World Cup after 16 years.
