= Victoria Edward =

New Zealand netball player

Personal information
- Full name: Victoria Edward Edgar (Née: Edward)
- Born: 3 February 1977 (age 49) Lower Hutt, New Zealand
- Occupation: Nurse
- Height: 1.77 m (5 ft 10 in)
- School: University of Otago

Netball career
- Playing positions: WD; C
| Years | Club team | Apps |
| 1998–99 | Otago Rebels | |
| 2000–02 | Waikato/Bay of Plenty Magic | |
| 2003–06 | Auckland Diamonds | |
| Years | National team | Caps |
| 2001–03 | New Zealand | 22 |

Victoria Edward (born 1977) was a New Zealand netball player who played 22 international matches for the national team, known as the Silver Ferns.

== Early life ==
Victoria Edward Edgar was born in Lower Hutt (Māori: Te Awakairangi) in the Wellington Region of the North Island of New Zealand on 3 February 1977. She attended Palmerston North Girls' High School, followed by Otago Polytechnic and the University of Otago in Dunedin on the South Island. She trained as nurse and worked as a nurse during much of her netball playing career.

== Netball career ==
In 1998-99 Edward played with the Otago Rebels team, which competed in the nationwide National Bank Cup. She then joined the Waikato/Bay of Plenty Magic located in Hamilton, playing there from 2000 to 2002. Having moved to Auckland, she transferred to the Auckland Diamonds for the 2003 to 2006 seasons, captaining the team in 2006. She played her first game for the Silver Ferns, the New Zealand national netball team, in June 2001, against South Africa. Edward played 22 matches for the team but was not selected for the 2003 World Netball Championships in Kingston, Jamaica, when New Zealand won the gold medal.
