= Carlos Paulette =

Peruvian football coach and trainer

Personal information
- Full name: Carlos Roberto Paulette
- Place of birth: Lima, Peru

Managerial career
- Years: Team
- –2001: Cheshunt F.C. (assistant)
- 2002–2006: Southend United F.C. (youth)
- 2002–2004: Charlton Athletic F.C. (youth)
- 2010–2013: Stella Club d'Adjamé
- 2013: King Faisal Babes
- 2014: Medeama SC
- 2016: Franklin United
- 2018–: Hawke's Bay United (youth)

Carlos Roberto Paulette is a Peruvian football coach and trainer, who currently manages the youth team of ISPS Handa Premiership side Hawke's Bay United in the National Youth League. Throughout his career, he has coached in Europe, South America, Africa and Oceania.

== Childhood ==
Born in Lima, Peru, his father was an amateur artist and sculptor.

== Career ==
=== Ghana ===
Paulette was named as coach of King Faisal Babes in 2013. Just after his appointment, he pledged to guide them to a top-four finish. He blamed the poor quality of officiating in the Ghana Premier League to the number of referees, saying that the increase in the number of referees does not commensurate the kind of training they are supposed to have to improve the league.

Next, he became coach of Medeama SC in 2014. Nearly three months after the Peruvian joined the club, he made an impact on the Ghanaian outfit by sending them straight to the 2014 CAF Confederation Cup play-off round on their continental debut by beating Panthers of Equatorial Guinea, MAS Fez of Morocco, and ZESCO United of Zambia. Their run was ended by Congolese side AC Leopards who beat them 5-4 on penalties. After the tournament, Paulette praised his players for their efforts.

=== New Zealand ===
It was through his previous connections and invitations by former technical director Rob Sherman that he attended conferences in New Zealand and engaged in colloquy with representatives from local clubs. Ultimately, he joined newly-formed Franklin United FC in 2016 ahead of the new season.

== Personal life ==
His wife, Glenis is from Pahiatua, New Zealand. They enjoy visiting Napier during the holidays. At present, he and his wife live in Auckland. One of his favorite interests is painting, which he sells online. Most of his pictures are supposed to depict fantasy worlds. Some of his paintings were shown in the Wanstead 2015 Art Trail.
