= Angelina Yates =

New Zealand netball player

Personal information
- Born: 25 December 1980 (age 44)

Angelina Yates (born 1980) is a New Zealand netball player in the ANZ Championship, playing for the Northern Mystics.
