= Pukekohe AFC =

Pukekohe Association Football Club
- Full name: Pukekohe Association Football Club
- Founded: 23 February 1960
- Ground: Bledisloe Park, John St, Pukekohe, New Zealand
- Coordinates: 37°12′19″S 174°54′13″E
- President: Dean Ihaia
- League: NRF Division 2
- 2026: NRF Division 2, 3rd of 9
- Website: http://www.pukekeoheafc.com
Home colours	Away colours

Pukekohe Association Football Club is an association football (soccer) club in Pukekohe, New Zealand.

Pukekohe AFC currently play in 8 Senior leagues across both Men's and Women's competitions. All teams compete in Auckland Football Federation competitions, except for both Men's and Women's First teams. The Men's First team currently play in the NRF Division 2, and the Women's Premier team compete in the Northern League Women's Premier.

== Current senior teams ==
Pukekohe AFC currently competes in the following competitions.

=== Men ===
==== 2013 ====
In 2013, Pukekohe AFC competed in 6 divisions within the Auckland Football Federation. The 6th team competed in the ASFA 2013 Division 7, a Sunday League team.

The Senior Mens First team entered the 2013 Counties Cup – a knockout tournament played over a number of weeks from teams in the Counties Manukau district. After beating South Auckland Rangers 2–0 away and Otahuhu Utd. 2–2 (4–2 PENS) at home they made it into the final for the first time in 8 years. Pukekohe AFC lost the final to Papakura City FC 6–1 at Michaels Ave. Reserve, Auckland, on 7 September 2013.

Team	League	Finished	Played	Won	Draw	Loss	GF	GA	GD	Pts	Coach/Manager
Mens First Team	AFF/NFF Mens Conference League	6th	18	5	2	11	26	52	−26	17	(Scotland) Tam Cramer / (New Zealand) Joe Morris*
Mens Reserve Team	AFF/NFF Mens Conference Reserve League	7th	16	5	1	10	30	37	−7	16	(New Zealand) Joe Morris / (England) Andrew Bond*
Mens Third Team	AFF Mens Division 7	4th	18	8	6	4	44	21	23	30	(England) Mike Botting
Mens Fourth Team	AFF Mens Division 8	9th	18	5	4	9	17	45	−28	19	(England) Jay Pressnell
Mens Over 35 Team	AFF Over 35 Veterans Division	1st	18	16	1	1	86	9	77	49	(England) Jon Waller
Mens Sunday League Team	ASFA 2013 Division 7	8th	14	3	0	11	18	48	−30	2	(New Zealand) Andre van Lieshout

*Joe Morris took over as First Team coach during the season, with Andrew Bond taking over the coaching role with the Reserves team

==== 2012 ====
In 2012, Pukekohe AFC competed in 5 divisions within the Auckland Football Federation.

Team	League	Finished	Played	Won	Draw	Loss	GF	GA	GD	Pts
Mens First Team	AFF/NFF Mens Conference League	5th	18	8	2	8	30	36	−6	26
Mens Reserve Team	AFF/NFF Mens Conference Reserve League	5th	14	6	2	6	26	24	2	20
Mens Third Team	AFF Mens Division 6	3rd	18	11	3	4	43	18	25	36
Mens Fourth Team	AFF Mens Division 7	8th	17	5	5	7	40	37	3	20
Mens Over 35 Team	AFF Over 35 Division 3 Masters	4th	16	7	5	4	46	29	17	26

=== Women ===
==== 2013 ====
The 2013 Women's premier team with the Lotto NRFL Women's Premier League Plate

In 2013, the Women's Premier team won the Lotto NRFL Women’s Premier League Plate, with a 2–0 win over Lynn-Avon United AFC in the Final. It was held on 25 August 2013 at Pukekohe High School fields. Laura Johnstone and Hannah Kraakman scored Pukekohe AFC's goals.

Team	League	Finished	Played	Won	Draw	Loss	GF	GA	GD	Pts	Coach/Manager
Women's Premier Team	2013 NRFL Women's Premier	8th	11	3	0	8	12	40	−28	9	(New Zealand) Steven Upfold
Women's Division Three	AFF Women's Division 3	3rd	14	8	2	4	15	12	3	26	(New Zealand) Annette Macfarlane / (New Zealand) Karla Shearer

==== 2012 ====
In 2012, Pukekohe AFC had its first New Zealand Football Representative. Courtney van Lieshout debuted for the New Zealand women's national under-17 football team on 11 April 2012 against New Caledonia Under 17 team in the Oceania Football Confederation Women's U-17 World Cup Qualifiers held at Mangere Park in Auckland, New Zealand. van Lieshout then went on to play as a substitute against Mexico women's national under-17 football team in the 2012 FIFA U-17 Women's World Cup in Azberbaijan. Mexico won the match 1–0.

Team	League	Finished	Played	Won	Draw	Loss	GF	GA	GD	Pts	Coach/Manager
Women's Premier Team	2012 NRFL Women's Premier	7th	16	5	1	10	24	64	−40	16	(New Zealand) Steven Upfold
Women's Division Three	AFF Women's Division 3	6th	19	6	3	10	28	33	−5	21	(New Zealand) Annette Macfarlane / (New Zealand) Karla Shearer

== Awards ==
- 2012 – New Zealand Football Whole of Football Plan – Club of the Year
- 2012/2013 – Greater Auckland Coaching Unit (GACU) Recognition through Innovation Award
- 2013 – New Zealand Football Quality Club Mark Level 1
