= Jodi Brown =

New Zealand netball player

Jodi Brown MNZM
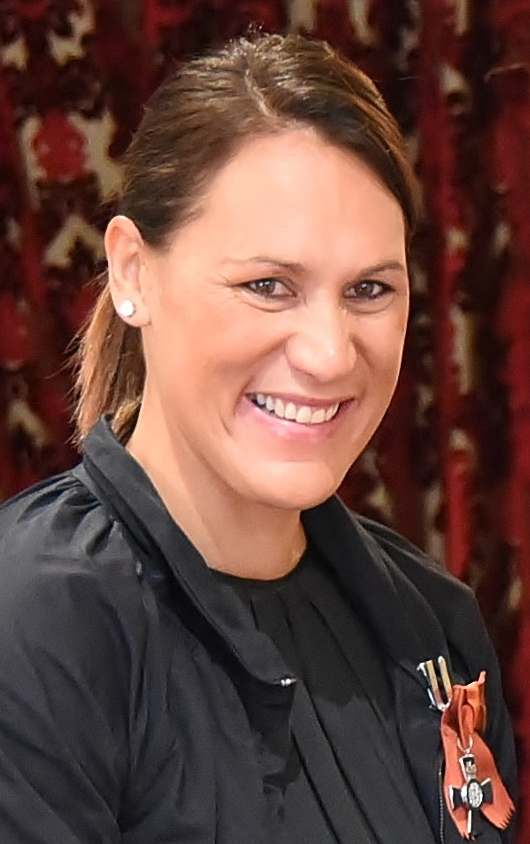
- Brown in 2016

Personal information
- Full name: Jodi Anne Brown (Née: Te) Huna
- Born: 6 May 1981 (age 45) Whanganui, New Zealand
- Height: 1.85 m (6 ft 1 in)
- Spouse: Markham Brown
- Children: 3

Netball career
- Playing positions: GA, GS
Years	Club team	Apps
1998–2002	Capital Shakers	
2003–04	Canterbury Flames	
2005–06	Auckland Diamonds	
2007	Otago Rebels	
2008–09	Canterbury Tactix	18
2010	Waikato Bay of Plenty Magic	16
2011-2014	Southern Steel	
2015-2016	Central Pulse	
Years	National team	Caps
2002–2015	New Zealand	61
Medal record
Representing New Zealand
Netball World Championships
Gold medal – first place	2003 Kingston	Netball
Silver medal – second place	2007 Auckland	Netball
Silver medal – second place	2015 Sydney	Netball
- Updated on 29 October 2010

Jodi Anne Brown MNZM (née Te Huna; born 6 May 1981 in Whanganui, New Zealand) is a retired New Zealand netball player. Brown was a member of the New Zealand national netball team, the Silver Ferns from 2002 to 2015, taking time off in between those periods due to injury and pregnancy, earning 61 caps. She has also played elite domestic netball in New Zealand for 13 years, and has signed with the Southern Steel for 2014. She played for the Central Pulse in 2015 and was getting set to play her final season in 2016 before she injured her ACL in the preseason and decided to retire from domestic netball after she had retired from international netball in 2015. In 2015, Jodi began co-coaching at St Hilda's Collegiate, Dunedin with the year nine A team. She has since followed this team through the years, which included a devastating 1 point loss in the SISS final. In 2018, Brown coached the St Hilda's Senior A team and also coached the Dunedin U17 team to 11th place at Nationals.

== Domestic career ==
In the National Bank Cup, Brown played three years with the Capital Shakers before moving to the Canterbury Flames. In 2004, she represented the Flames making the final. She then moved to the Auckland Diamonds the following year, and then captained the Otago Rebels in 2007.

With the start of the ANZ Championship in 2008, Brown continued with the Canterbury franchise, renamed the "Canterbury Tactix", for the inaugural season, but only played six rounds before she pulled out due to pregnancy. She returned to the Tactix the following year, but switched to the Waikato Bay of Plenty Magic for the 2010 season. Brown was partnered in the Magic shooting circle with Irene van Dyk, delivering a strong performance that helped the Magic progress to the grand final that year. But at the end of the 2010 season, Jodi Brown announced that she would not return for 2011, expecting the birth of her second child. However, Brown did return to netball seven weeks since birth of her second child. Brown was called in to play for the Southern Steel against the West Coast Fever, but lost; Brown played in the second half. In the 2012 ANZ Championship Season, Jodi Brown has signed to the Southern Steel.

She played for the Central Pulse in the 2015 ANZ Championship Season and was intending to retire after the 2016 season. However, she sustained an injury during the Pulse's first match of the pre-season tournament as she had ruptured her Anterior Cruciate Ligament in her right knee. The damage did not finish there, Brown also sustaining a grade two tear of the Medial Cruciate Ligament. Given the rigorous road of physical therapy and regaining fitness and given her previous intention to retire after the 2016 season, Brown announced she was retiring shortly after the confirmation of her injury.

== International career ==
Brown received her first call-up to the Silver Ferns in 2002, but debuted the following year against Jamaica, and was a member of the team that won the 2003 Netball World Championships. She suffered a left knee injury just days before the Silver Ferns' opening match at the 2006 Commonwealth Games, ruling her out of the competition. Brown stayed in the squad for the 2007 Netball World Championships. Brown pulled out of the Silver Ferns in early 2008 when she became pregnant with her first child. She was widely touted to rejoin the Silver Ferns in 2010 for their Commonwealth Games campaign, but pulled out for family reasons. She returned to the Silver Ferns in 2012 for the Constellation Cup and Quad Series. She officially retired from international netball in 2015 after 13 years and 61-test internationals, after helping the Silver Ferns level the Constellation Cup series against Australia. In the 2016 New Year Honours, Brown was appointed a Member of the New Zealand Order of Merit for services to netball.

== Personal life ==
In 2007, Jodi Te Huna married Otago Nuggets basketball player Markham Brown, changing her name to Jodi Brown.
