= Anna Stanley =

New Zealand netball player (born 1976)

Anna Stanley MNZM
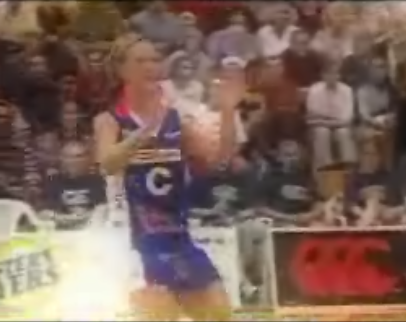

Personal information
- Born: Anna Rowberry; 31 March 1976 (age 50) Christchurch, New Zealand
- Occupations: Netballer, Commentator, Phys Ed Teacher
- Height: 1.76 m (5 ft 9 in)
- Spouse: Jeremy Stanley (m. 2006)
- Children: 3

Netball career
- Playing positions: C, WA, WD
Years	Club team	Apps
1994–2007	Auckland Diamonds; Waikato-Bay of Plenty Magic	
Years	National team	Caps
1994–2007	New Zealand	91
Medal record
Representing New Zealand
Netball
Netball World Championships
Bronze medal – third place	1995 Birmingham	Netball
Silver medal – second place	1999 Christchurch	Netball
Gold medal – first place	2003 Kingston	Netball
Commonwealth Games
Silver medal – second place	1998 Kuala Lumpur	Netball
Silver medal – second place	2002 Manchester	Netball
Gold medal – first place	2006 Melbourne	Netball

Anna Catherine Stanley MNZM (née Rowberry, born 31 March 1976 in Christchurch, New Zealand) is a New Zealand netballer, who captained the national team (the Silver Ferns), to win the 2003 Netball World Championships in Jamaica.

She led the Silver Ferns to a drought-breaking series win over Australia (the first since 1989) in the winter of 2004, and played for the Auckland Diamonds in the National Bank Cup national league in 2004 and 2005.

== Early life ==
The daughter of a former New Zealand player, Stanley had not played senior provincial netball when she was sent to her international debut against Jamaica in 1994. Her career dipped to its lowest point when sidelined by selectors for 18 months, but she was recalled in 2002.

Stanley is known in netball circles for her speed on the court and her signature "bullet pass".

== Career ==
Stanley represented Otago, Canterbury and Auckland in New Zealand's top netball league. In 2004, she suffered a knee injury during the Silver Ferns' clean sweep series win over arch-rivals Australia. In 2005, after several months of rehabilitation, she returned to the court for the Auckland Diamonds. She returned to the Silver Ferns in October of that year, and was a member of the Commonwealth Games gold medal-winning team of March 2006.

Only a few weeks into the 2006 National Bank Cup season, she announced that she was pregnant and would be retiring from netball to concentrate on her family life, thus ending a fluctuating but successful career on the court. Stanley was named in the Waikato-Bay of Plenty Magic squad in New Zealand's top netball league in 2007, however she did not play this season for the team in the league.

Instead Stanley devoted time to motherhood, and in 2007 became an Ambassador for Rett New Zealand, an organisation to assist children and their families that suffer from Rett syndrome. In 2008 with the start of the ANZ Championship, Stanley has been a television presenter and netball commentator with Sky Sports. She also co-hosts the weekly netball magazine style show On Court with Kathryn Harby-Williams and Tania Dalton. She finished her international career with 91 caps.

== Personal life ==
Stanley is married to medical surgeon and former Auckland and All Black rugby union player, Jeremy Stanley. They have a daughter, Jaya and a son, Nico and on 20 January 2011, eight days after their baby's due date, they became parents to Zac, who weighed in at 8 pounds 2 ounces (3.7 kg). While pregnant with their first child, Jaya, Stanley and her husband relocated from her Mount Maunganui base to Whangarei.

== Honours ==
Anna Stanley was appointed a Member of the New Zealand Order of Merit for services to netball in the 2004 New Year Honours.
