= Jenny Ferguson =

New Zealand netball player

Personal information
- Occupation: Physiotherapist

Netball career
- Playing position: GD
Years	Club team	Apps
2000–02	Otago Rebels	
2003–07	Southern Sting	
2008–2010	Southern Steel (TRP)	
- Updated on 18 March 2010

Jenny Ferguson is a retired New Zealand netball player. Ferguson played domestic netball with the Otago Rebels from 2000 to 2002 and the Southern Sting from 2003 to 2007, captaining the side in 2007. She is also a former New Zealand A captain. Ferguson announced her retirement from all aspects of netball after the Sting won the 2007 National Bank Cup against the Northern Force. This was the last season of the National Bank Cup, which was replaced by a new trans-Tasman netball league called the ANZ Championship.

Ferguson linked up with the new Southern ANZ Championship franchise, the Southern Steel, as a physiotherapist. Nevertheless, she has been called up as a temporary replacement for injured or absent Steel players in each year of the ANZ Championship: in 2008 Ferguson filled in for former teammate Megan Hutton who was finishing her stint in England with Team Northumbria; in 2009 she was a temporary replacement player for the injured Sheryl Scanlan; and in 2010 provided injury cover during the preseason.
