= Auckland Diamonds =

Defunct New Zealand netball team

- Founded: 1998; 28 years ago
- Disbanded: 2007; 19 years ago
- Based in: Waitakere City
- Region: Auckland Region
- Home venue: Trusts Stadium
- League: Coca-Cola Cup/National Bank Cup
Uniform

Auckland Diamonds were a former New Zealand netball team based in Waitakere City, Auckland Region. As a result, they were also known as Auckland Waitakere Diamonds. Between 1998 and 2007, Diamonds played in the Coca-Cola Cup/National Bank Cup league. Diamonds finished as semi-finalists on four occasions – 1998, 1999, 2005 and 2007. Ahead of the 2008 season, Diamonds merged with Northern Force to form the new ANZ Championship team, Northern Mystics.

== History ==
=== Founding members ===
In 1998, together with, Bay of Plenty Magic, Capital Shakers, Canterbury Flames, Counties Manukau Cometz, Northern Force, Otago Rebels, Southern Sting, Waikato Wildcats and Western Flyers, Diamonds, were founding members of the Coca-Cola Cup/National Bank Cup league. Together with Cometz and Force, Diamonds were one of three teams from the Auckland Region to play in the league. Due to poor ticket sales, the three teams faced early suggestions that they should merge. Diamonds enjoyed a local rivalry with Cometz. In the six seasons the teams played against each other, Diamonds won four and Cometz won two.

=== Semi-finalists ===
Diamonds finished as semi-finalists on four occasions – 1998, 1999, 2005 and 2007. In 1998 they were defeated in the semis by the inaugural champions, Otago Rebels. In 2005 they lost out to Southern Sting.

=== Merger ===
Ahead of the 2008 season, Diamonds merged with Northern Force to form the new ANZ Championship team, Northern Mystics.

== Home venues ==
Between 2004 and 2007, Diamonds played the majority of their home matches at Waitakere's Trusts Stadium. They previously played home matches at Kohimarama's ASB Stadium.

== Stats ==
Season	Position	Won	Drawn	Lost
1998	4th			
1999	4th			
2000	6th			
2001	7th			
2002	6th			
2003	5th			
2004	5th			
2005	4th			
2006	5th			
2007	4th	5	0	3?

== Notable former players ==
=== Internationals ===
New Zealand

- Victoria Edward
- Temepara George
- Paula Griffin
- Carron Jerram
- Leonie Leaver
- Jenny-May Coffin
- Jo Morrison
- Grace Rasmussen
- Anna Rowberry
- Anna Scarlett
- Lorna Suafoa
- Jodi Te Huna
- Maria Tutaia
- Louisa Wall

New Zealand Fast5

- Rachel Rasmussen

Australia

- Kathryn Harby-Williams

England

- Jo Morrison

Fiji

- Susan Tagicakibau

Jamaica

- Elaine Davis

Samoa

- Rachel Rasmussen
- Lorna Suafoa

=== ANZ Championship players ===
- Rawinia Everitt
- Brigette Tapene

=== Captains ===
	Years
Anna Rowberry	c. 2001–2005
Victoria Edward	2006
Stephanie Bond	2007

== Coaches ==
=== Head coaches ===
Coach	Years
Georgie Salter	2001–2002
Joan Hodson	2002–2004
Sue Hawkins	2004–2007

== Main sponsors ==
Sponsors	Seasons
SkyCity	c.2000
The Trusts	20xx–2007
