= Georgie Salter =

New Zealand netball player and coach (1950–2018)

Georgie Salter MNZM
Personal information
- Full name: Georgina Hera Salter (Née: Hapuku)
- Born: 2 December 1950 Raetihi, New Zealand
- Died: 28 November 2018 (aged 67) Oamaru, New Zealand
- Occupation: Netball coach
- Relative: Reinga Bloxham (niece)

Netball career
- Playing positions: GD, WD, C, WA
Years	Club team	Apps
1969–1974	Otago	
1976–1978	Otago	
Years	National team	Caps
1974–1975	New Zealand	8
Coaching career
- Years: Team
- 1998–2000: Otago Rebels
- 1991–2000: Otago
- 1999–2000: New Zealand U21
- 2001–2002: Auckland Diamonds
- 2008: Otago
- 2017–2018: Netball South
Medal record
Representing New Zealand
World Netball Tournament
Bronze medal – third place	1975 Auckland	Tournament

Georgina Hera Salter MNZM (née Hapuku; 2 December 1950 – 28 November 2018) was a New Zealand netball coach and international netball player.

== Biography ==
Salter was born in Raetihi, in the central North Island, but spent much of her life in and around Oamaru in Otago.

Salter was a member of the national netball team, the Silver Ferns, from 1974 to 1975. She coached the Otago Rebels to win the inaugural Coca-Cola Cup in 1998, and guided Otago to the national provincial title in the same year.

In the 2019 New Year Honours, Salter was appointed a Member of the New Zealand Order of Merit for services to netball. The Queen's approval of the award took effect on 27 November 2018, prior to the date of decease.
