= Anna Galvan =

New Zealand netball player

Personal information
- Full name: Anna Galvan (Née: Veronese)
- Born: 20 November 1978 (age 47) Christchurch, New Zealand
- Height: 1.84 m (6 ft 0 in)
- Children: 3
- School: Villa Maria College
- University: University of Canterbury; Victoria University, Melbourne; Stanford University

Netball career
- Playing positions: GK, GD, WD
Years	Club team	Apps
1998–2002	Canterbury Flames	
2003–2005	Southern Sting	
2010	Canterbury Tactix	
Years	National team	Caps
2000–01, 04–05	New Zealand A	
2002–03	Silver Ferns	
Medal record
Representing New Zealand
Commonwealth Games
Silver medal – second place	2002 Manchester	Netball
- Updated on 19 March 2010

Anna Galvan (née Veronese; born 20 November 1978) is a retired New Zealand netball player.

== Domestic career ==
Galvan had a long netball career, spanning 17 years. During this time she played for two National Bank Cup franchises as a defender, with the Canterbury Flames (1997–2002) and the Southern Sting (2003–2006). She was a key defender in the champion Southern Sting's success as well being a pivotal defender for her original Flames. However, she had a break from netball in 2003 to have her first child, and at the end of the 2006 season to have her second child and a third child was born in 2008. Galvan was enticed to return to top-level competition by signing with the Canterbury Tactix for the 2010 season of the ANZ Championship. She retired from all netball at the completion of the 2014 ANZ championship Season.

== International netball ==
Galvan has had previous international netball experience including being part of the Silver Ferns from 2000 to 2003. She competed at the 2002 Commonwealth Games in Manchester where the Silver Ferns lost the Gold Medal match to Australia in heartbreaking fashion, losing in double extra time. Falling pregnant just after the 2002 Commonwealth Games meant that she had to pull out of the Silver Ferns team going to the Netball World Cup, being replaced by Leana de Bruin. Galvan was also part of the New Zealand Under 21 team who went to the World Youth Cup in Canada in 1996, coming second to Australia in the final. She was part of the NZU21's from 1995 - 1998 and the New Zealand A Team in 2000, 2001, 2004 (Captain) and 2005.

== Family ==
Anna and her husband Hugh Galvan have three children. Her eldest, Isabella, is following in her mother's footsteps in competitive netball. Her son, Harry has represented New Zealand in the Junior Men’s 8 at the Super World Rowing Championships in St Catharine’s, Canada in August 2024.
