= Palmerston North Girls' High School =

- Te Kura Kōhine o Papaioea
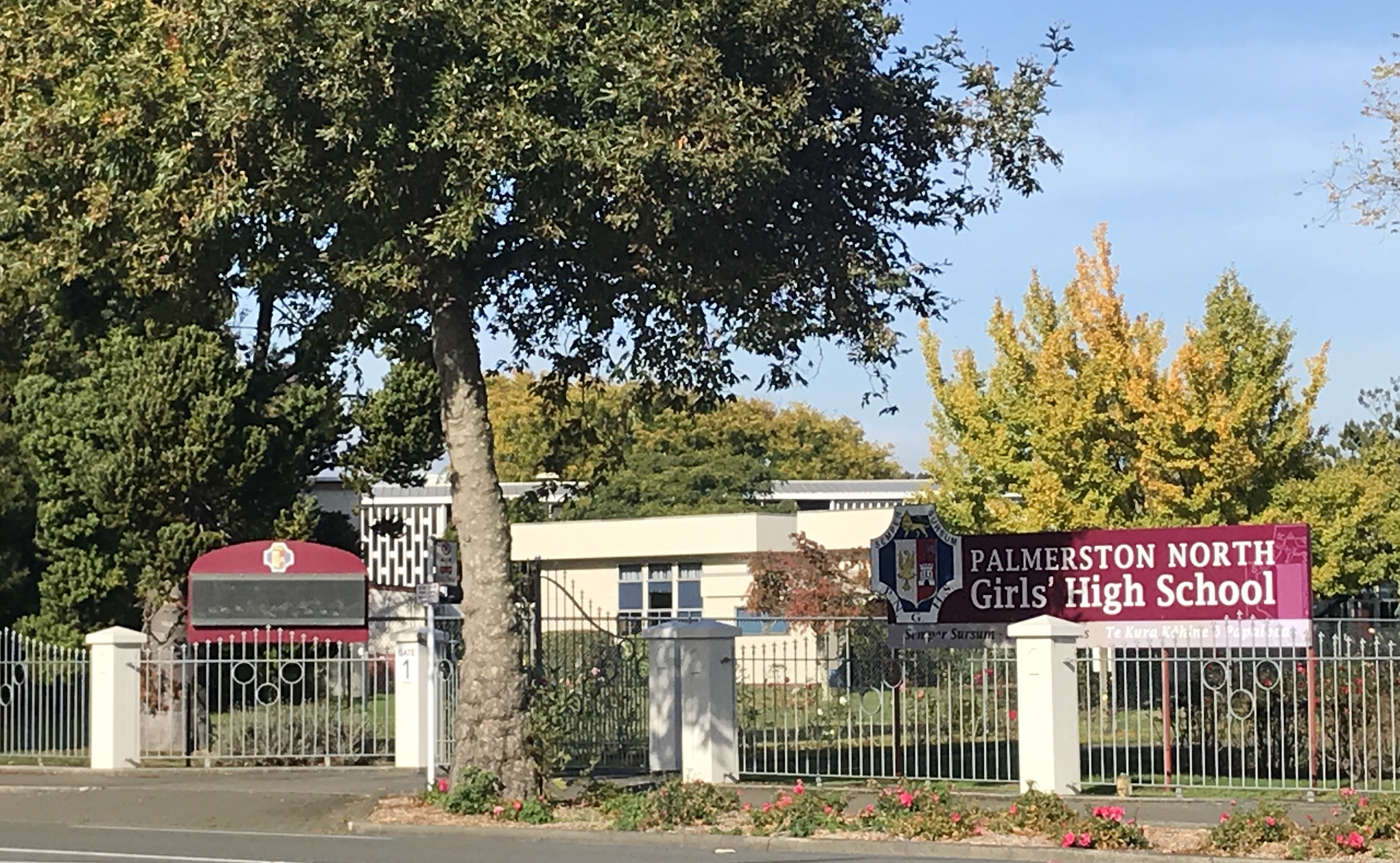

Location
- Fitzherbert Avenue; Palmerston North 4410; New Zealand; 40.3676°S 175.6184°E

Information
- Type: Single-sex secondary school for girls (Year 9–13)
- Motto: Semper Sursum 'Ever Upwards'
- Established: 1902
- Ministry of Education Institution no.: 203
- Principal: Tracy Walker
- Enrolment: 1,329 (July 2026)
- Socio-economic decile: 8P
- Website: pnghs.school.nz

Palmerston North Girls' High School (PNGHS) is a secondary school for girls, located in the suburb of West End in the city of Palmerston North, New Zealand.

== Location ==
The main entrance of the school is located on Fitzherbert Avenue, near the Victoria Esplanade. Adjacent to the North are Huia Street and the Manawatu Lawn Tennis Club. Behind the school is Manawaroa/Ongley Park.

== History ==
In 1902, Palmerston North High School was a co-ed secondary school created with an initial roll of 84 students (40 boys and 44 girls). The first classes were held at St Andrews Presbyterian Church Sunday School hall.

In 1912, Palmerston North High School was split into two single-sex schools: Palmerston North Girls’ High School and Palmerston North Boys’ High School.

== Enrolment ==
As of July 2026, Palmerston North Girls' High School has roll of 1,329 students, of which 261 (19.6%) identify as Māori.

As of 2026, Palmerston North Girls' High School has an Equity Index of 433, placing it amongst schools whose students have below average socioeconomic barriers to achievement (roughly equivalent to decile 7 under the former socio-economic decile system).

== Academics ==
Palmerston North Girls' High School follows the New Zealand Curriculum. In Years 11 to 13, students complete the National Certificate of Educational Achievement (NCEA), the main secondary school qualification in New Zealand.

In 2024, 90.4% of students leaving PNGHS attained at least NCEA Level 1, 86.0% attained at least NCEA Level 2, and 70.6% attained at least NCEA Level 3. For schools in the same equity index band, the national attainment rates for girls were 91.6%, 85.4%, and 67.8% respectively.

== School houses ==
Palmerston North Girls' High School is divided into four houses. On enrolment, students are placed in a house at random, or into a house with family ties if possible. Staff are also placed in the houses. Each house is named after a former principal of the school.

The house names and colours are as follows:

Colours	Name
	Rhodes
	Stephens
	Mills
	Hodges

The student councils organise events, many of which contribute to the inter-house competition and points towards the award of the Nash Cup.

== Notable alumnae ==
- Rita Angus – painter
- Hannah Rowe – New Zealand White Fern (cricket)
- Georgia Barnett – 2015 Manawatu Sportswoman of the Year and Women's Black Sticks (hockey)
- Hannah Broederlow – New Zealand netball player
- Jessica Clarke – New Zealand model
- Joy Cowley – writer
- Rebecca Hull – New Zealand Women's rugby union player
- Anna Leese – opera singer
- Liana Leota – New Zealand netball player
- Emily Naylor – New Zealand Women's Black Sticks (hockey)
- Kayla Sharland – New Zealand Women's Black Sticks (hockey)
- Caroline Williams – journalist
- Maia Cotton – model
