= Jessica Clarke (model) =

New Zealand model

- Born: Jessica Roimata Clarke; 29 April 1993 (age 33); New Zealand
- Modelling information
- Height: 1.80 m (5 ft 11 in)
- Hair colour: Light Brown
- Eye colour: Blue
- Agency: Why Not Model Management (Milan)

Jessica Roimata Clarke (born 1993) is a New Zealand model. She began professionally modelling at the age of 15, and by 17 had appeared on the catwalks of Milan, Paris, New York and London. Fresh to New York she was the Calvin Klein exclusive at NY fashion week SS/10 and continued to walk with the likes of Marc by Marc, Giorgio Armani, Mulberry, Salvatore Ferragamo, Emilio Pucci, Lanvin, Elie Saab, Sonia Rykiel and Dolce & Gabbana. She was shot by Mario Testino for D&G spring summer 2011 campaign. In 2011, she became the first New Zealander to model for Victoria's Secret, appearing in the brand's annual fashion show.

== Background ==
Clarke who is now based in New York is originally from Palmerston North. She was a student at Palmerston North Girls' High School and won Miss Teen Manawatu in 2009. She also played netball for her high school's senior team and was a Māori representative player.
