= Gael Nagaiya =

New Zealand netball player and selector

Personal information
- Full name: Née: Robinson
- Born: 8 May 1966 (age 60)
- Height: 1.85 m (6 ft 1 in)

Netball career
- Playing positions: GK, WD, GD
| Years | National team | Caps |
| 1992 | New Zealand | 2 |

Gael Nagaiya (born 8 May 1966) is a former netball player who, in 1992, was the 100th woman ever to play for the New Zealand national netball team. She has also served as a selector for the team.

== Netball career ==
Gael Nagaiya (née Robinson) played netball for Auckland and was also selected for the New Zealand Under-21 team. In 1992, she was selected for the Silver Ferns, the national netball team, making her debut against England during the team's tour to the United Kingdom at the end of that year. She played one other test match on the tour but those were her only matches for New Zealand.

After a coaching and administrative role in netball clubs, Nagaiya was appointed as a selector for the Silver Ferns in 2011. In 2012 she became an emerging talent selector and in 2013 she was made the convenor of the national netball selectors, a position she held until 2018.
