= Goaltending (basketball) =

Illegal blocking of a downward traveling shot in basketball

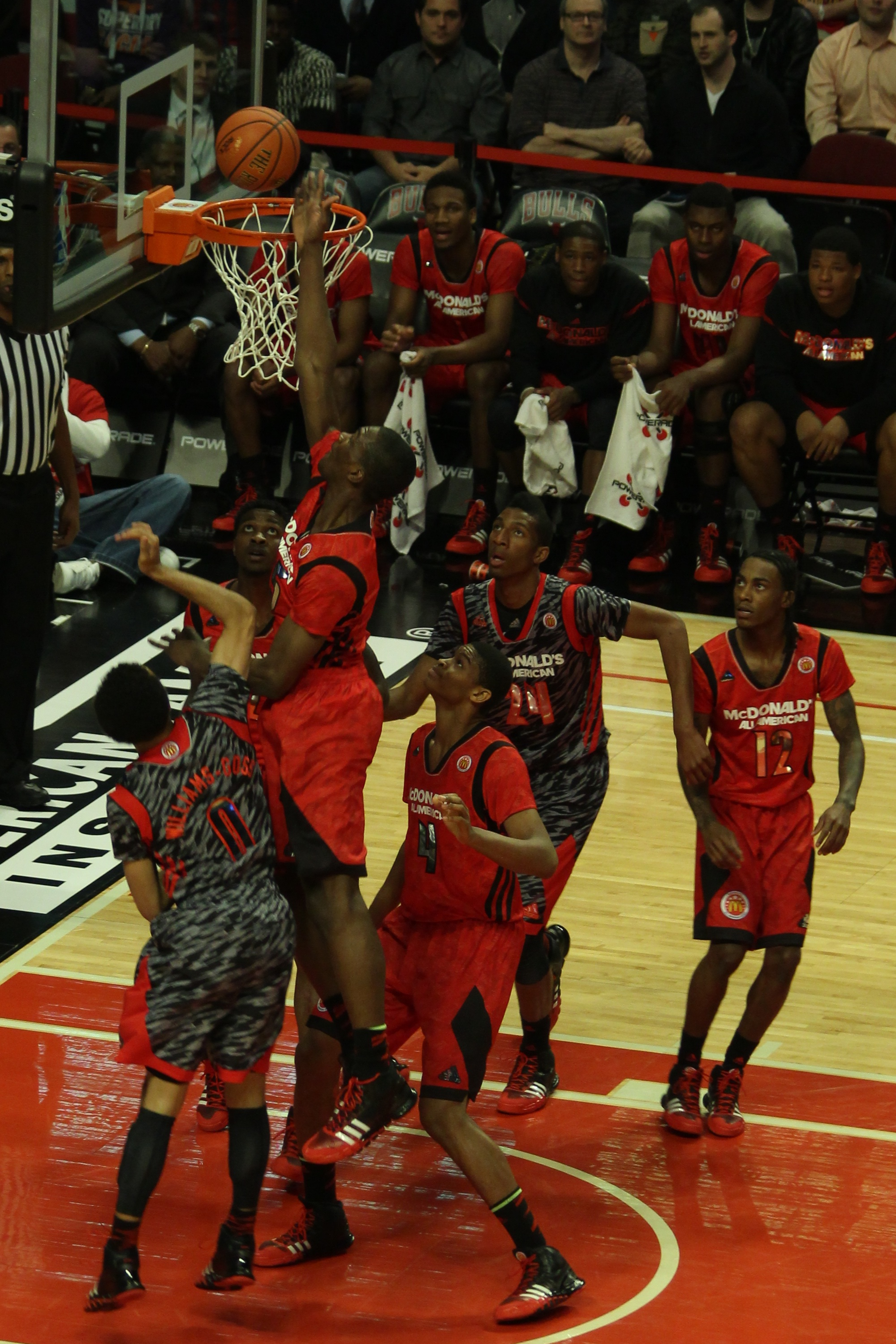
Goaltending includes interfering with a shot on its downward arc or after it has touched the backboard and has a chance of going in the hoop

Goaltending is a violation of the rules in the sport of basketball. It consists of certain forms of player interference with the ball while it is on its way to the basket. It is goaltending if a player touches the ball when it is:

- (a) in downward flight;
- (b) above the basket rim and within an imaginary cylinder projecting above the rim;
- (c) already touching the rim; or
- (d) (varying at certain levels of the sport) after it has touched the backboard and has a chance of going in the hoop.

In the NCAA and NBA, goaltending is also called if the ball has already touched the backboard while being above the height of the rim in its flight, regardless of it being in an upward or downward flight or whether it is directly above the rim.

Goaltending in this context defines by exclusion what is considered a legal block of a field goal. In high school and NCAA basketball, goaltending is also called when a player interferes with a free throw at any time in its flight towards the basket.

== Effect ==
If goaltending is called for interference with a field goal, the shooting team is awarded the points for the field goal as if it had been made. The team that commits the violation then inbounds the ball at its baseline, the same as if it had conceded a basket. In high school and NCAA basketball, if goaltending is called on a free throw, the shooting team is awarded one point, and a technical foul is called against the offending player.

Goaltending is commonly confused with the related violation of basket interference (also called offensive goaltending) which occurs during an attempted field goal when an offensive player touches the basket, the rim, or the ball when it is on the rim or in the imaginary cylinder directly over the rim. In this case, the basket if made is not allowed and the ball is awarded to the other team. FIBA rules allow a defender to block any shot that is over the rim and the ball is on its upward flight.

The prohibition against goaltending was adopted by the NCAA in 1944 (and later by the NBL) specifically because of George Mikan. Prior to the arrival of the high-jumping 6 ft 10 in (208 cm) Mikan, goaltending was not addressed because it was thought physically impossible.
