= Counties Manukau =

Counties Manukau is a region that encompasses South Auckland and adjoining suburban and rural areas, located in New Zealand. However, the area has no universally agreed boundaries. The name derives from the former Manukau and Franklin counties. Organisations that use the term in their name include:

== Administration ==
- Counties Manukau District Health Board, a former public health organisation
- Counties Manukau Police District, a New Zealand Police district

== Sports teams ==
- Counties Manukau Cometz, a netball team
- Counties Manukau cricket team, which competes in the Hawke Cup
- Counties Manukau Rugby Union, the local governing body
- Counties Manukau Steelers, a rugby union team
- Counties Manukau rugby league team, which competes in the NZRL Premiership

== See also ==
- The Auckland Council wards that cover approximately the same area:
  - Manukau, Manurewa-Papakura, Howick and Franklin
