= Jo Morrison =

New Zealand netball player

Personal information
- Born: 20 March 1975 (age 51) Cosford, Shropshire, England
- Height: 184 cm (6 ft 0 in)
- Spouse: Paul Morrison
- Children: 4
- School: Motueka High School
- University: University of Otago

Netball career
Medal record
Representing New Zealand
Commonwealth Games
Silver medal – second place	1998 Kuala Lumpur	Netball

Joanne Elizabeth Morrison (née Steed; born 20 March 1975) is a former New Zealand international netball representative, who played in the Silver Ferns team that won a silver medal at the 1998 Commonwealth Games in Kuala Lumpur.

In 2021 Morrison was appointed the role of assistant coach of the Southern Steel under Reinga Bloxham.
