= National Bank Cup =

Defunct New Zealand netball league

- Sport: Netball
- Founded: 1998; 28 years ago
- Folded: 2007; 19 years ago
- Replaced by: ANZ Championship
- Administrator: Netball New Zealand
- No. of teams: 8
- Country: New Zealand
- Last champion: Southern Sting (7th title)
- Most titles: Southern Sting (7 titles)
- Broadcaster: ONESport
- Sponsors: Coca-Cola; National Bank of New Zealand

The National Bank Cup, originally known as the Coca-Cola Cup, was the top level national New Zealand netball league between 1998 and 2007. The league was organised by Netball New Zealand. Between 1998 and 2001, it was sponsored by Coca-Cola. In 2002, the National Bank of New Zealand took over as the main sponsor. Otago Rebels were the inaugural premiers. However, Southern Sting, were subsequently the competition's most successful team. Sting played in all ten grand finals and won seven of the ten titles played for. Waikato Bay of Plenty Magic were the second most successful team, winning two premierships. Ahead of the 2008 season, the National Bank Cup league effectively merged with Australia's Commonwealth Bank Trophy to form the ANZ Championship.

== Teams ==
The ten founding members of the Coca-Cola Cup league were Auckland Diamonds, Bay of Plenty Magic, Capital Shakers, Canterbury Flames, Counties Manukau Cometz, Northern Force, Otago Rebels, Southern Sting, Waikato Wildcats and Western Flyers. After the inaugural 1997 season, Waikato Wildcats and Bay of Plenty Magic merged to form Waikato Bay of Plenty Magic. The league originally featured three teams from the Auckland Region – Auckland Diamonds, Counties Manukau Cometz and Northern Force. However, in 2003, Cometz were dropped from the league.

In 2008, when the National Bank Cup league was replaced by the ANZ Championship, Magic and Flames became founders of the new league. Flames were rebranded as Canterbury Tactix. The remaining six National Bank Cup teams were merged into three new teams. Southern Sting and Otago Rebels joined forces to become Southern Steel, Capital Shakers and Western Flyers merged as Central Pulse, while Auckland Diamonds and Northern Force became Northern Mystics. Magic are the only team from the Coca-Cola Cup/National Bank Cup era to have retained their original name.

=== 2007 ===
Team	City/Suburb	Region	Home Venue
Auckland Diamonds	Waitakere City	Auckland Region	Trusts Stadium
Capital Shakers	Wellington	Wellington Region	TSB Bank Arena
Canterbury Flames	Christchurch	Canterbury/Tasman	Westpac Centre
Northern Force	North Shore	Auckland Region	North Shore Events Centre
Otago Rebels	Dunedin	Otago	Edgar Centre
Southern Sting	Invercargill	Southland	Stadium Southland
Waikato Bay of Plenty Magic	Hamilton	Waikato/Bay of Plenty	Mystery Creek Events Centre
Western Flyers		Hawke's Bay/Taranaki/Manawatū-Whanganui	

=== Earlier teams ===
Team	City/Suburb	Region	Debut season	Final season
Bay of Plenty Magic	Hamilton	Bay of Plenty	1998	1998
Counties Manukau Cometz	Papatoetoe	Counties Manukau/Thames Valley	1998	2003
Waikato Wildcats		Waikato	1998	1998

== Format ==
Teams played a single round of matches, playing every other team once. The top four teams then qualified for the semi-finals.

== History ==
=== Inaugural champions ===
With a team coached by Georgie Salter and featuring Belinda Blair, Belinda Colling, Victoria Edward, Adine Harper, Lesley Nicol, Anna Rowberry and Jo Steed, Otago Rebels finished the inaugural 1998 Coca-Cola Cup season as champions. In the grand-final they defeated Southern Sting 57–50.

=== Southern Sting ===
Southern Sting were subsequently the league's most successful team. Between 1998 and 2007, Sting played in all ten grand finals and won seven of the ten titles played for. Between 1999 and 2004, Sting won six successive titles. The team was coached by Robyn Broughton and featured, among others, Donna Loffhagen, Bernice Mene, Belinda Colling, Tania Dalton, Lesley Nicol and Adine Harper. One reason behind Sting's success was that they were pioneers in women's professional sports. Bernice Mene was one of the first professional netball players in New Zealand. With Sting paying their players, they successfully recruited the best players from throughout New Zealand.

=== Waikato Bay of Plenty Magic ===
The only team to challenge Southern Sting's monopoly was Waikato Bay of Plenty Magic. In 2005 and 2006, with a team coached by Noeline Taurua and featuring Amigene Metcalfe, Irene van Dyk, Casey Williams, Laura Langman and Joline Henry, Magic won two successive National Bank Cup titles. On both occasions they defeated Sting in the grand final.

== Grand finals ==
=== Coca-Cola Cup ===
Season	Winners	Score	Runners up	Venue
1998	Otago Rebels	57–50	Southern Sting	Edgar Centre
1999	Southern Sting	63–54	Otago Rebels	Edgar Centre
2000	Southern Sting	43–40	Canterbury Flames	Stadium Southland
2001	Southern Sting	47–44	Canterbury Flames	Stadium Southland

=== National Bank Cup ===
Season	Winners	Score	Runners up	Venue
2002	Southern Sting	54–48	Canterbury Flames	Stadium Southland
2003	Southern Sting	51–49	Northern Force	Stadium Southland
2004	Southern Sting	63–55	Canterbury Flames	Stadium Southland
2005	Waikato Bay of Plenty Magic	65–39	Southern Sting	Stadium Southland
2006	Waikato Bay of Plenty Magic	67–43	Southern Sting	Mystery Creek Events Centre
2007	Southern Sting	50–49	Northern Force	North Shore Events Centre

== Minor premierships ==
Season	Winners
1998	Otago Rebels
1999	Otago Rebels
2000	Southern Sting
2001	Canterbury Flames ?
2002	Southern Sting
2003	Southern Sting
2004	Southern Sting
2005	?
2006	Southern Sting
2007	Southern Sting

== Main sponsors ==
Sponsors	Seasons
Coca-Cola	1998–2001
National Bank of New Zealand	2002–2007

== Gallery ==
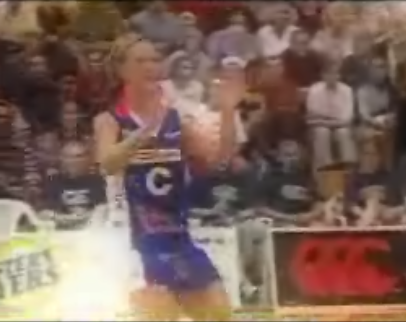
Anna Rowberry was a member of the 1998 Otago Rebels team that were inaugural Coca-Cola Cup champions

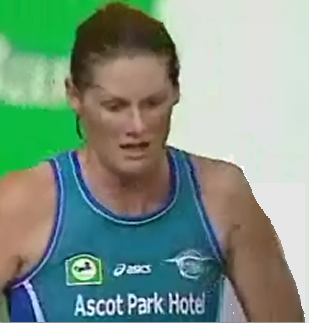
Donna Wilkins playing for Southern Sting in 2007
