= ANZ Championship =

Former netball league in Australia and New Zealand

- Founded: 2007; 19 years ago
- First season: 2008
- Folded: 2016; 10 years ago
- Replaced by: Suncorp Super Netball; ANZ Premiership
- Owner: Trans-Tasman Netball League Ltd (TTNL)
- No. of teams: 10
- Countries: Australia; New Zealand
- Last champions: Queensland Firebirds (3rd title)
- Most titles: Queensland Firebirds (3 titles)
- Broadcaster: see Media coverage
- Sponsor: Australia and New Zealand Banking Group
- Level on pyramid: 1
- Website: www.ANZ-Championship.com

The ANZ Championship, also known as the Trans-Tasman Netball League, was a netball league featuring teams from both Australia and New Zealand. Between 2008 and 2016, it was the top-level league in both countries. The competition was owned and administered by Trans-Tasman Netball League Ltd (TTNL), a joint venture between Netball Australia and Netball New Zealand. It was effectively a merger of Australia's Commonwealth Bank Trophy and New Zealand's National Bank Cup. Its main sponsor was the Australia and New Zealand Banking Group.

In 2008, New South Wales Swifts were the inaugural ANZ Championship winners. Queensland Firebirds were the most successful team during the ANZ Championship era, playing in five grand finals and winning three premierships in 2011, 2015 and 2016. They were also the only team to win back to back ANZ Championship titles. Both Melbourne Vixens (2009, 2014) and Adelaide Thunderbirds (2010, 2013) won two titles each. The most successful New Zealand team were Waikato Bay of Plenty Magic who were premiers in 2012 and were the only team in the competitions history, to contest the finals series every year.

In May 2016, Netball Australia and Netball New Zealand announced that the ANZ Championship would be discontinued after the 2016 season. In Australia it was replaced by Suncorp Super Netball and in New Zealand it was replaced by the ANZ Premiership.

== Teams ==
=== 2008 ===
The ANZ Championship featured five Australian and five New Zealand teams. Adelaide Thunderbirds and Queensland Firebirds of the Commonwealth Bank Trophy league became founders of the new league. Several other Commonwealth Bank Trophy teams were transformed to form ANZ Championship teams. Sydney Swifts and Hunter Jaegers merged to become New South Wales Swifts, Melbourne Kestrels and Melbourne Phoenix merged to become Melbourne Vixens and Perth Orioles were rebranded as West Coast Fever.

Waikato Bay of Plenty Magic and Canterbury Flames of the National Bank Cup league also became founder members of the new league. Flames were rebranded as Canterbury Tactix. The remaining six National Bank Cup teams were merged into three new teams. Southern Sting and Otago Rebels joined forces to become Southern Steel, Capital Shakers and Western Flyers merged as Central Pulse, while Auckland Diamonds and Northern Force became Northern Mystics.

Team	Former league	Former names/merged teams
Adelaide Thunderbirds	Commonwealth Bank Trophy	
Canterbury Tactix	National Bank Cup	Canterbury Flames
Central Pulse		Capital Shakers, Western Flyers
Melbourne Vixens		Melbourne Kestrels, Melbourne Phoenix
New South Wales Swifts		Sydney Swifts, Hunter Jaegers
Northern Mystics		Auckland Diamonds, Northern Force
Queensland Firebirds	Commonwealth Bank Trophy	
Southern Steel		Southern Sting, Otago Rebels
Waikato Bay of Plenty Magic	National Bank Cup	
West Coast Fever	Commonwealth Bank Trophy	Perth Orioles

=== 2016 ===
==== Australian Conference ====
Team	Home venue/base	Home city	State/Territory
Adelaide Thunderbirds	Netball SA Stadium	Adelaide	South Australia
Melbourne Vixens	Hisense Arena	Melbourne	Victoria
New South Wales Swifts	Sydney Olympic Park Sports Centre	Sydney	New South Wales
Queensland Firebirds	Brisbane Convention & Exhibition Centre	Brisbane	Queensland
West Coast Fever	HBF Stadium	Perth	Western Australia

==== New Zealand Conference ====
Team	Home venue/base	Home city	Zone/Region
Central Pulse	TSB Bank Arena	Wellington	Central
Mainland Tactix	Horncastle Arena	Christchurch	Mainland (Canterbury)
Northern Mystics	The Trusts Arena	Auckland	Northern (Northland, Auckland)
Southern Steel	ILT Stadium Southland	Invercargill	South (Southland, Otago)
Waikato Bay of Plenty Magic	Claudelands Arena	Hamilton	Waikato/Bay of Plenty

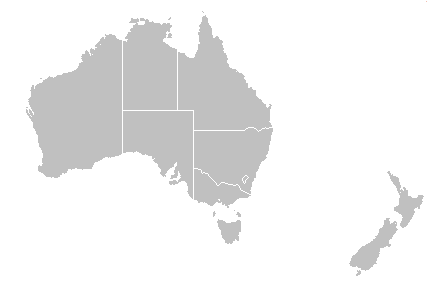

== History ==
=== Formation ===
The ANZ Championship was founded in 2007 and played it inaugural season in 2008. The competition was owned and administered by Trans-Tasman Netball League Ltd (TTNL), a joint venture between Netball Australia and Netball New Zealand. It was effectively a merger of Australia's Commonwealth Bank Trophy and New Zealand's National Bank Cup. Its main sponsor was the Australia and New Zealand Banking Group.

=== Five seasons, five champions ===
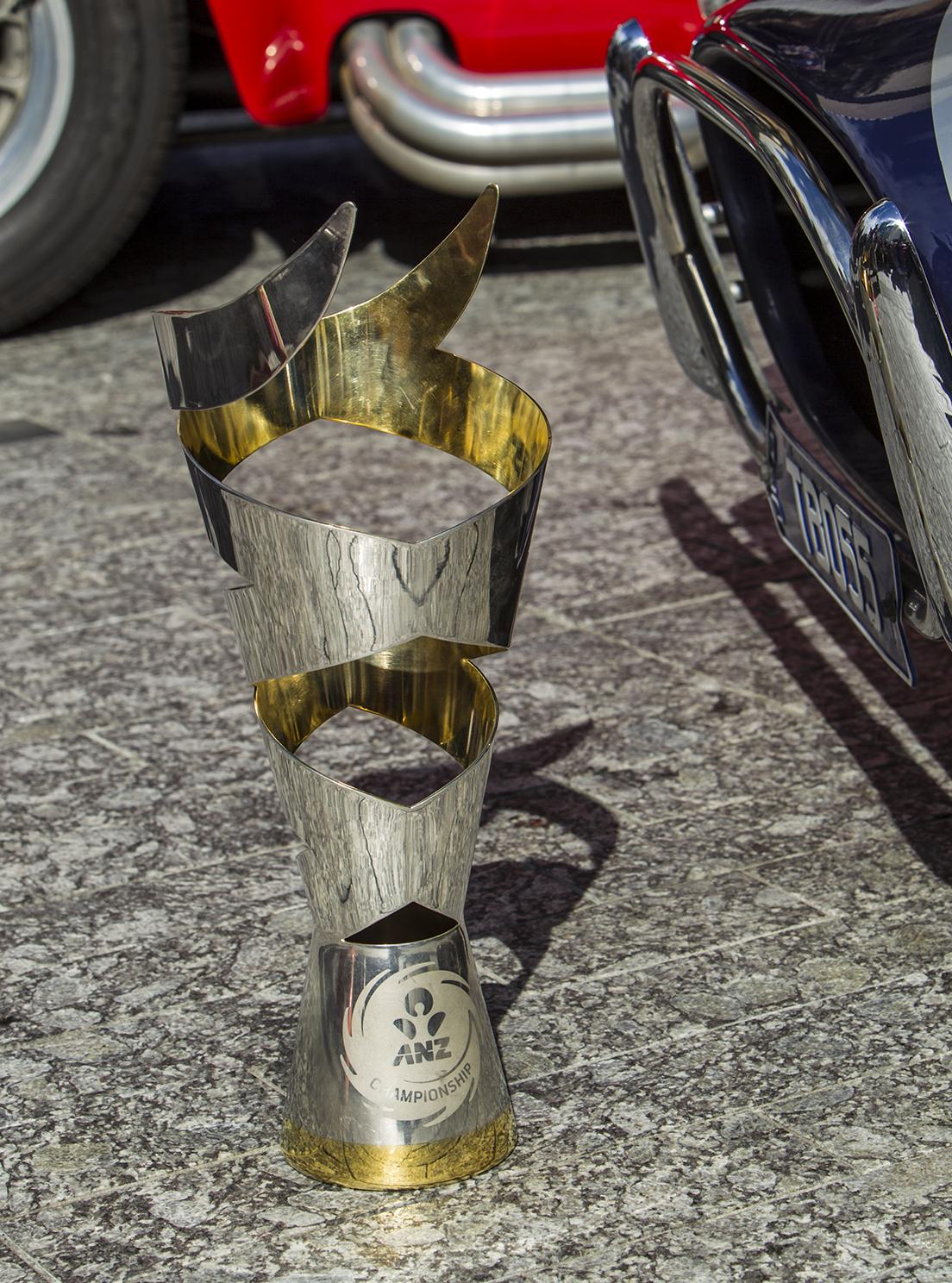
ANZ Netball Championship Trophy (2015)

In 2008, New South Wales Swifts became the inaugural ANZ Championship winners after defeating the minor premiers, Waikato Bay of Plenty Magic 65–56 in the grand final. In 2009, Melbourne Vixens were both minor premiers and overall champions. Swifts went through the entire 2010 regular season home and away undefeated, winning 13 consecutive matches and finishing as minor premiers. However they subsequently lost both the major semi-final and the preliminary final to Adelaide Thunderbirds and Magic respectively and eventually finished the season in third place. After defeating Swifts in the major semi-final, Thunderbirds defeated Magic 52–42 in the grand final.

In 2011, Queensland Firebirds finished the season undefeated. They became the first team in the history of the ANZ Championship to go through the regular season and the playoffs without losing a single match. In the grand final they defeated Northern Mystics. In 2012, Magic became fifth team in as many seasons to win the title. Vixens won the minor premiership after winning 10 of their 13 matches. Meanwhile, Magic lost their first four matches. However, they subsequently won 12 matches in a row to finish third during the regular season and champions overall. In the minor semi-final they defeated Thunderbirds and in the preliminary final they defeated Mystics. In the grand final they defeated Vixens 41–38. As a result, they became the first, and only, New Zealand team to win the ANZ Championship.

=== Waikato Bay of Plenty Magic ===
The most successful New Zealand team during ANZ Championship era were Waikato Bay of Plenty Magic. In 2008 they were minor premiers and overall runners up. In 2009 they were regular season runners up. In 2010 they were overall runners up and grand finalists for a second time. In 2011 they were again regular season runners up. In 2012 they made their third grand final appearance and, after defeating Melbourne Vixens 41–38 they finished as premiers. As a result, they became the first, and only, New Zealand team to win the ANZ Championship. In both 2015 and 2016, Magic also finished as winners of the New Zealand Conference.

=== Thunderbirds and Vixens: second titles ===
Having previously won the 2010 title, in 2013 Adelaide Thunderbirds became the first team to win a second championship. Having won their first title in 2009, in 2014 Melbourne Vixens won their second ANZ Championship.

=== Queensland Firebirds ===
Queensland Firebirds were the most successful team during the ANZ Championship era. In 2009, Roselee Jencke was appointed head coach. Between 2011 and 2016, Jencke guided Firebirds to five grand finals and three premierships in 2011, 2015 and 2016. They were the only team to win back to back ANZ Championship titles. Romelda Aiken, Laura Geitz and Clare McMeniman formed the nucleus of the Firebirds squad and featured in all three Championship winning squads.

=== Demise ===
In May 2016, Netball Australia and Netball New Zealand announced that the ANZ Championship would be discontinued after the 2016 season. In Australia it was replaced by Suncorp Super Netball and in New Zealand it was replaced by the ANZ Premiership.

== Format ==
=== 2008–2014 ===
Between 2008 and 2014, the regular season saw the five Australian teams play each other twice and the New Zealand teams once. Similarly, the New Zealand teams played each other twice and each of the Australian teams once. The ten teams played 13 games – eight home-and-away matches against teams from their country and five alternating home or away games against teams from the other country. The top four teams from the regular season subsequently qualified for the Finals Series which used a Page–McIntyre system to determine the overall champion.

=== Conference system ===
The 2015 season saw some major format changes. The league introduced separate Australian and New Zealand conferences, a restructured six-team Finals Series and a new competition, the Challenge Trophy. Teams continued to play 13 games – eight home-and-away matches against teams in their own conference and five alternating home or away games against teams in the other conference. The ANZ Championship also introduced draws for the first time. During the regular season, drawn games would see both teams get a point each. Extra time will only be played during the Finals Series. On 15 March 2015, the Round 3 match between New South Wales Swifts and Queensland Firebirds finished 47–47. It was the first official draw in the eight seasons of the league.

== Grand finals ==
Season	Winners	Score	Runners up	Venue	Attendance
2008	New South Wales Swifts	65–56	Waikato Bay of Plenty Magic	Acer Arena	12,999
2009	Melbourne Vixens	54–46	Adelaide Thunderbirds	Hisense Arena	9,500
2010	Adelaide Thunderbirds	52–42	Waikato Bay of Plenty Magic	Adelaide Entertainment Centre	9,300
2011	Queensland Firebirds	57–44	Northern Mystics	Brisbane Convention & Exhibition Centre	3,541
2012	Waikato Bay of Plenty Magic	41–38	Melbourne Vixens	Hisense Arena	10,500
2013	Adelaide Thunderbirds	50–48	Queensland Firebirds	Adelaide Entertainment Centre	
2014	Melbourne Vixens	53–42	Queensland Firebirds	Hisense Arena	9,345
2015	Queensland Firebirds	57–56	New South Wales Swifts	Brisbane Entertainment Centre	
2016	Queensland Firebirds	69–67	New South Wales Swifts	Brisbane Entertainment Centre	10,312

== Minor premierships ==
Seasons	Team
2008	Waikato Bay of Plenty Magic
2009	Melbourne Vixens
2010	New South Wales Swifts
2011	Queensland Firebirds
2012	Melbourne Vixens
2013	Adelaide Thunderbirds
2014	Melbourne Vixens
2015	Queensland Firebirds
2016	Southern Steel

== Media coverage ==
Seasons	Live broadcasters	Highlights/Replays
2008	Fox Sports (Australia); Sky Sport (New Zealand)	
2009	Network 10; Sky Sport (New Zealand)	One HD; TVNZ
2010	Network 10; Sky Sport (New Zealand)	One HD; TVNZ
2011	Network 10; Sky Sport (New Zealand)	One HD; TVNZ
2012	Network 10; Sky Sport (New Zealand)	One HD; TVNZ
2013	Fox Sports (Australia); Sky Sport (New Zealand)	SBS 2
2014	Fox Sports (Australia); Sky Sport (New Zealand); SBS 2	Te Reo; NITV
2015	Fox Sports (Australia); Sky Sport (New Zealand); One	Te Reo; Prime TV
2016	Fox Sports (Australia); Sky Sport (New Zealand); Network Ten; One	
