= 2007 in New Zealand =

- Decades: 1980s; 1990s; 2000s; 2010s; 2020s
- See also: History of New Zealand; List of years in New Zealand; Timeline of New Zealand history

The following lists events that happened during 2007 in New Zealand.

== Population ==
- Estimated population as of 31 December: 4,245,700
- Increase since 31 December 2006: 36,600 (0.87%)
- Males per 100 Females: 95.8

== Incumbents ==
=== Regal and viceregal ===
- Head of State – Elizabeth II
- Governor-General – Anand Satyanand
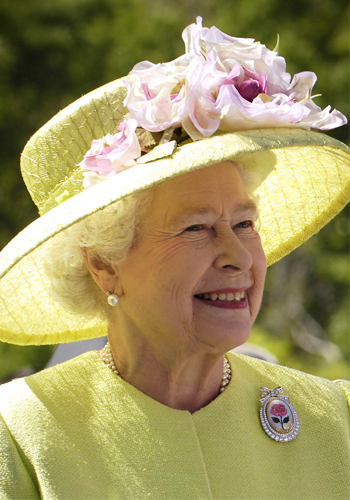
Elizabeth II

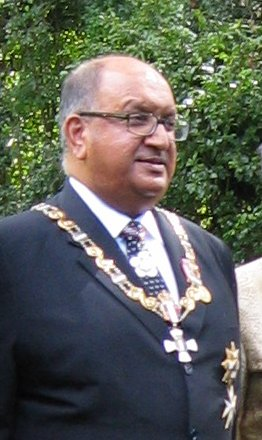
Anand Satyanand

=== Government ===
2007 was the second full year since the election of the 48th Parliament. The government was a Labour-Progressive coalition with supply and confidence from United Future and New Zealand First in exchange for two ministerial spots outside Cabinet.

- Speaker of the House – Margaret Wilson (Labour) since 3 March 2005
- Prime Minister – Helen Clark (Labour) since 5 December 1999
- Deputy Prime Minister – Michael Cullen (Labour) since 15 August 2002
- Minister of Finance – Michael Cullen (Labour) since 5 December 1999
- Minister of Foreign Affairs – Winston Peters (NZ First) since October 2005

Non-Labour ministers

- Jim Anderton (Progressives) – Minister of Agriculture (within Cabinet)
- Peter Dunne (United Future) – Minister of Revenue and Associate Minister of Health (outside Cabinet)
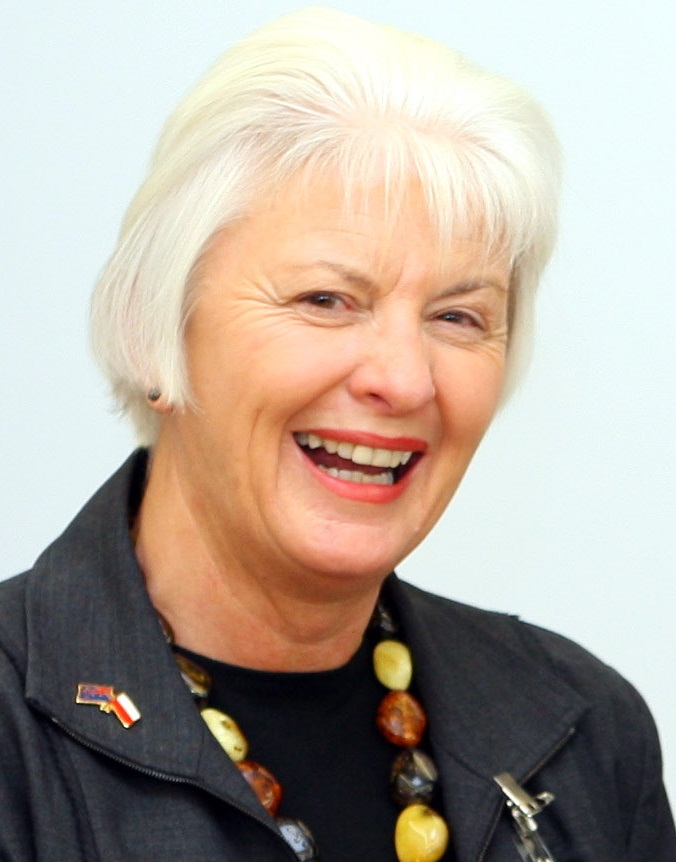
Margaret Wilson

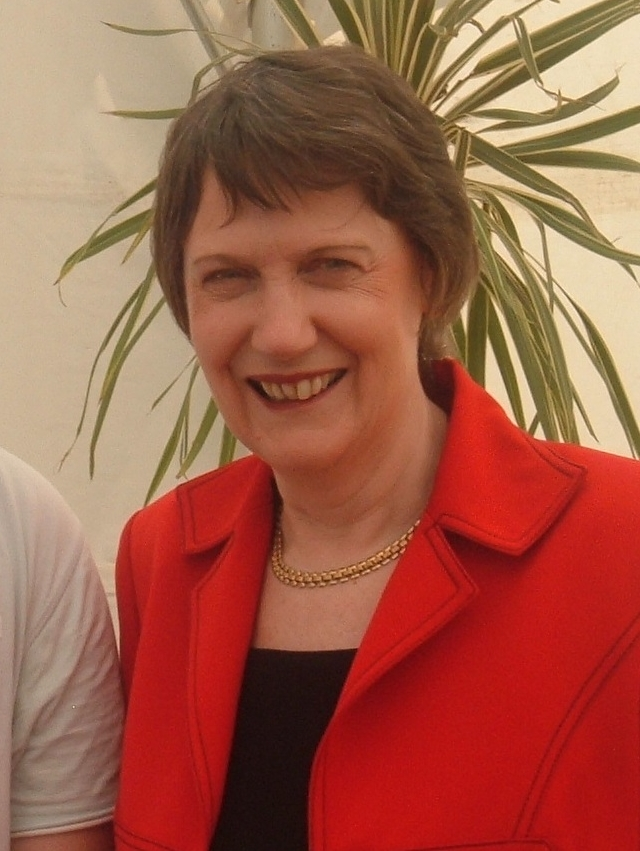
Helen Clark

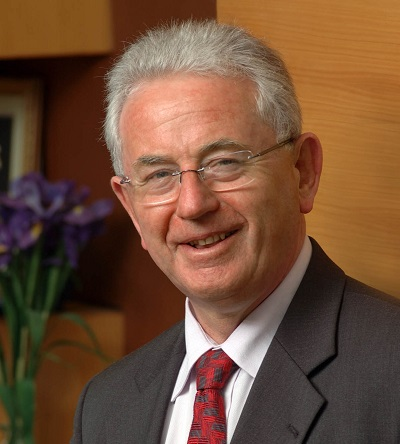
Michael Cullen

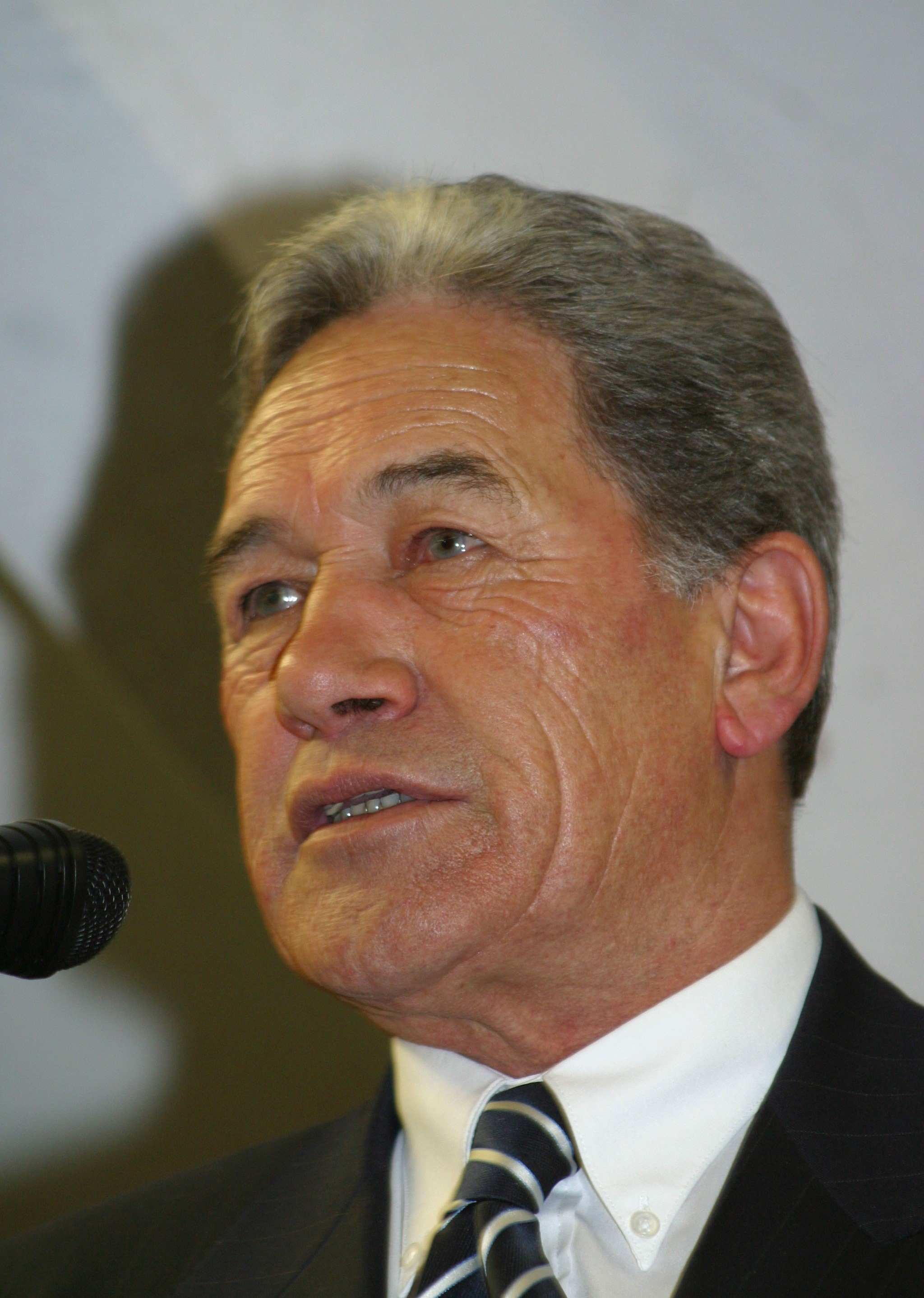
Winston Peters

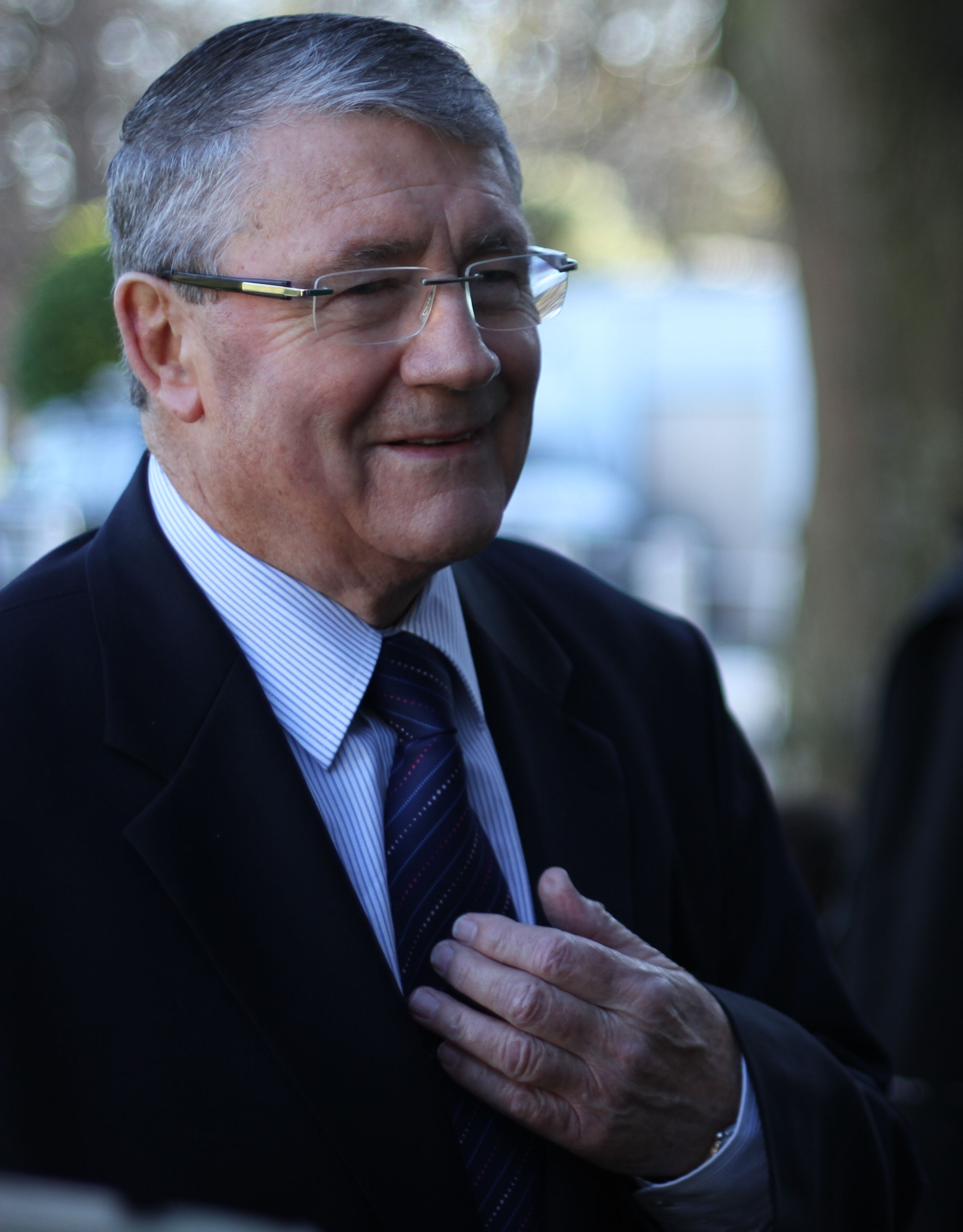
Jim Anderton

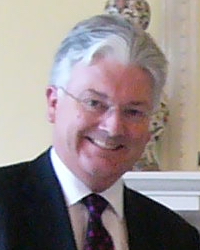
Peter Dunne

=== Other party leaders ===
- National – John Key (Leader of the Opposition) since 27 November 2006
- Act – Rodney Hide, since 13 June 2004
- Greens – Jeanette Fitzsimons (since 1995) and Russel Norman (since 3 June 2006)
- Māori Party – Tariana Turia and Pita Sharples, both since 7 July 2004
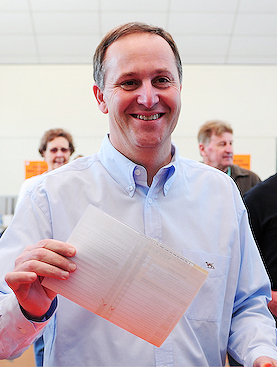
John Key

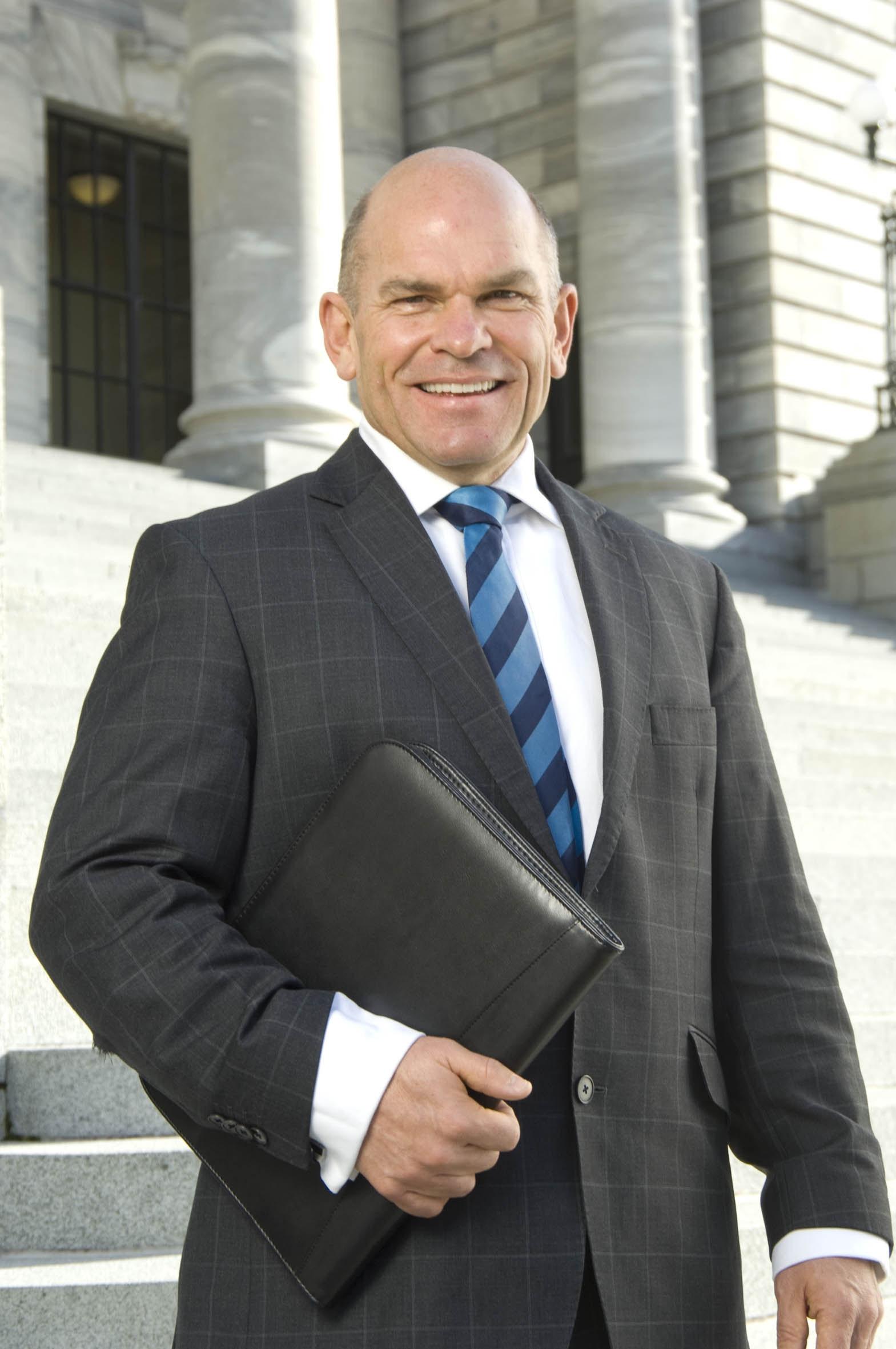
Rodney Hide

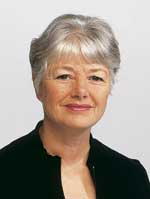
Jeanette Fitzsimons

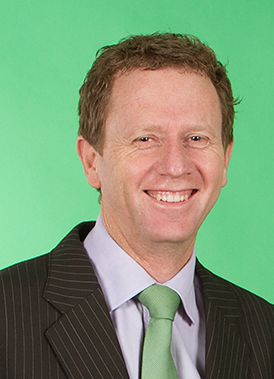
Russel Norman

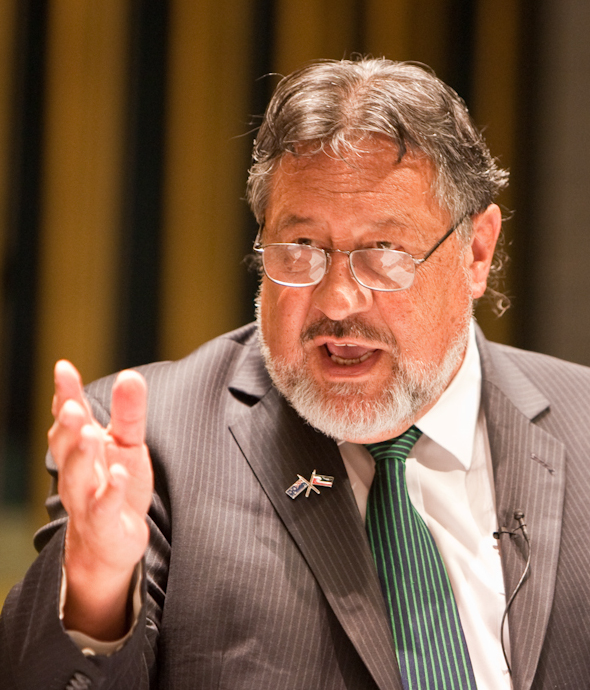
Pita Sharples

=== Judiciary ===
- Chief Justice — Sian Elias
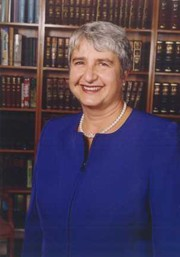
Dame Sian Elias

=== Main centre leaders ===
- Mayor of Auckland – Dick Hubbard, since October 2004 and replaced by John Banks in the October elections.
- Mayor of Tauranga – Stuart Crosby, since October 2004
- Mayor of Hamilton – Bob Simcock (since May 2007), Michael Redman (Oct 2004 – May 2007)
- Mayor of Wellington – Kerry Prendergast, since October 2001
- Mayor of Christchurch – Garry Moore, since October 1998 and replaced by Bob Parker in the October elections.
- Mayor of Dunedin – Peter Chin, since October 2004
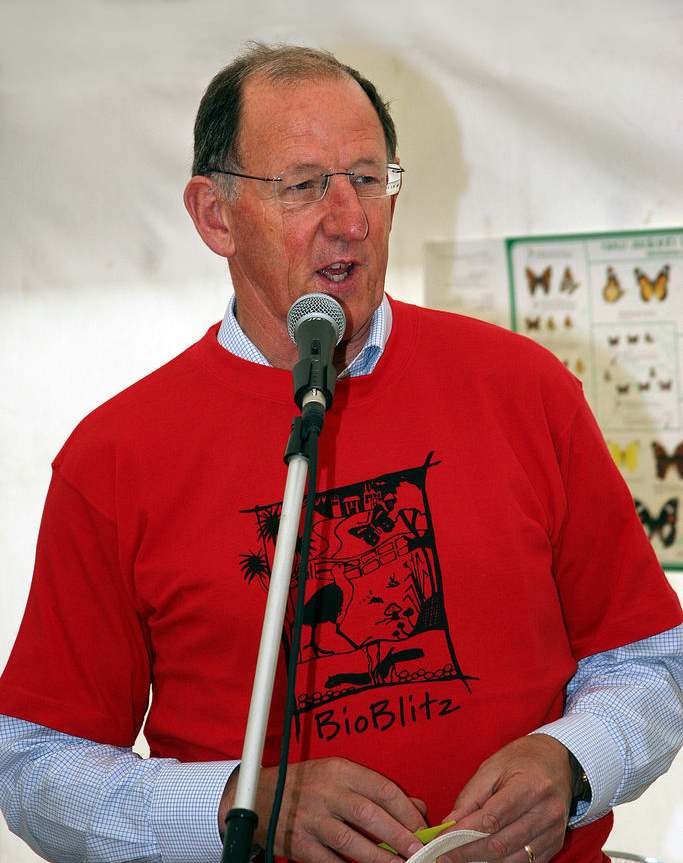
Dick Hubbard

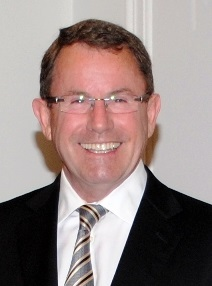
John Banks

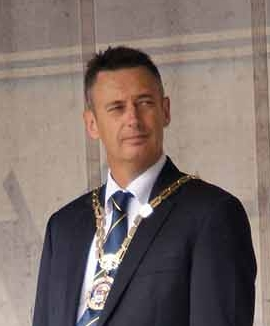
Stuart Crosby

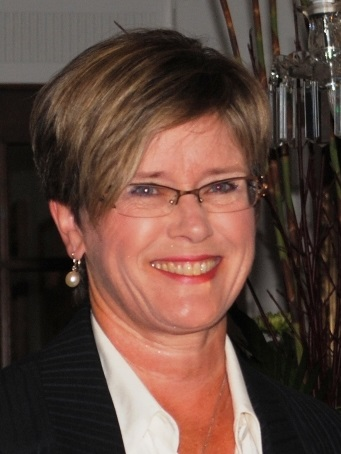
Kerry Prendergast

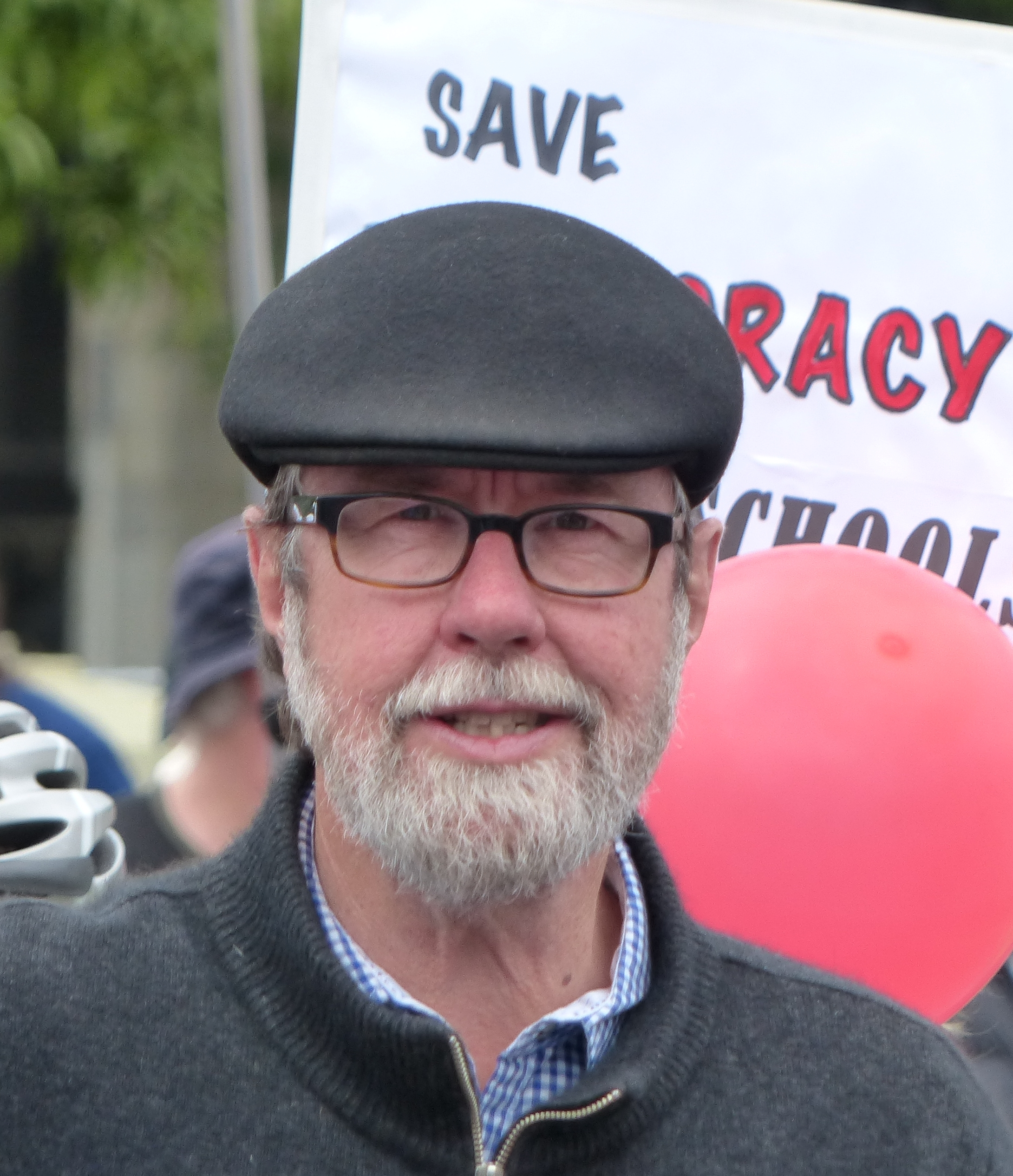
Garry Moore

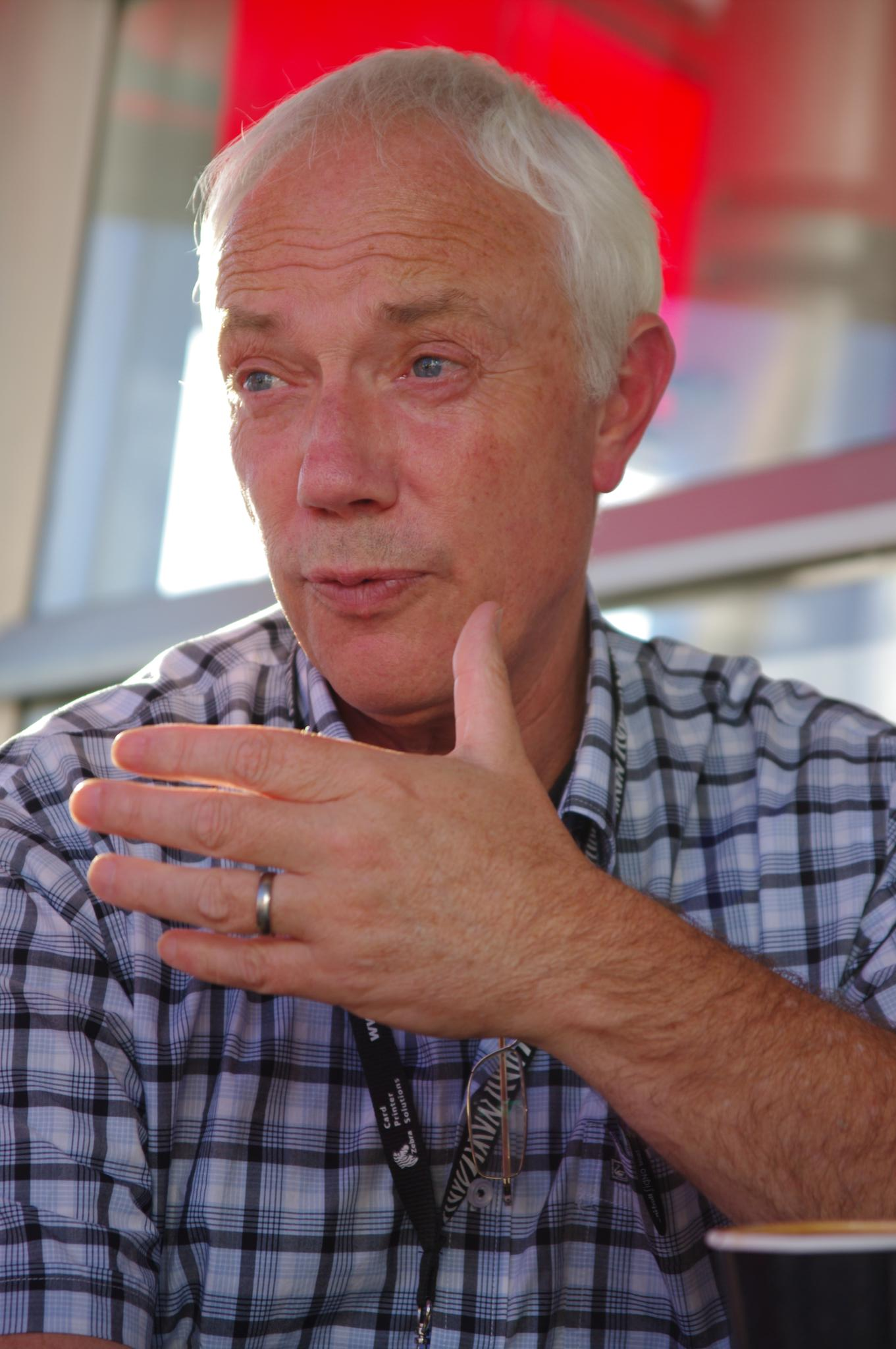
Bob Parker

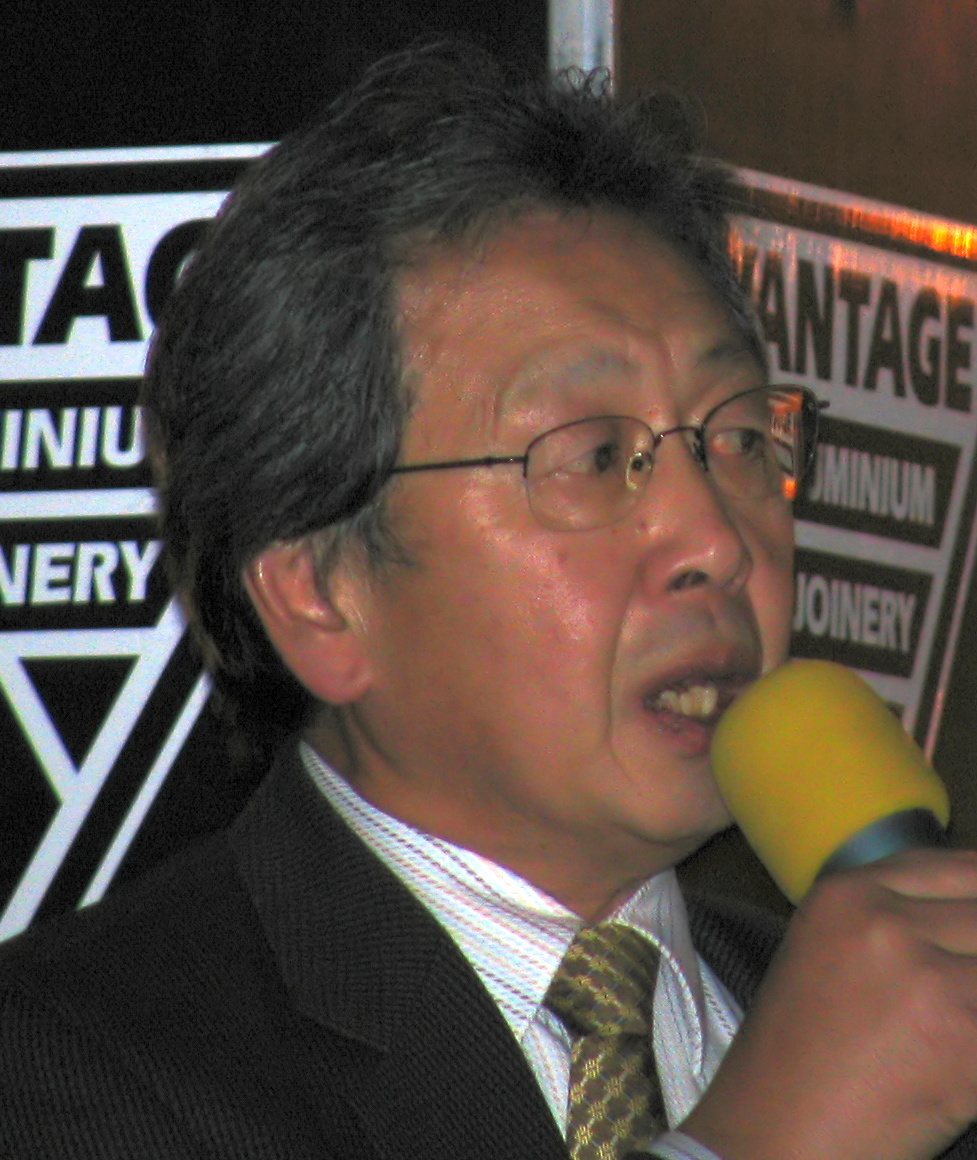
Peter Chin

== Events ==
=== January ===
- 3 January – The official Christmas-New Year holiday period ends with the lowest holiday road toll since 1981. Nine people died on the roads.
- 3 January – An extensive manhunt is launched for convicted murderer Graeme Burton, wanted for breaching parole.
- 4 January – A large (approx 7000m^{2}) Tegel Foods chicken processing plant in the Christchurch suburb of Sockburn is razed. Authorities rule out arson.
- 6 January – Graeme Burton is recaptured in Wellington, after fatally shooting one man and wounding two others.
- 12 January – New Line Cinema announces that it will never work with Peter Jackson again after Jackson's allegations of financial impropriety and breach of contract.
- 16 January – The Department of Conservation declares the South Island kōkako to be extinct. It was later revised to 'data deficient' in 2013 due to potential sightings.
- 17 January – The lawyer for Algerian refugee and alleged security risk Ahmed Zaoui lodges a formal request to be reunited with his family with the Minister of Immigration.
- 17 January – Sir Edmund Hillary returns to Antarctica to take part in the celebration of the 50th Anniversary of Scott Base.
- 18 January – Officials in Auckland announce four cases of typhoid have been diagnosed in the South Auckland suburb of Clendon since mid-December.
- 20 January – The chainsaw used to cut down the sole Monterey pine on One Tree Hill in 1994 is found for sale on auction site TradeMe.
- 20 January – New Zealand stays resolute as the newly self-installed government of Fiji's military Prime Minister Frank Bainimarama threatens unspecified consequences if sanctions continue.
- 23 January – Six-year-old Jayden Headley is handed into Hamilton police by his grandfather, after being missing for five months.

=== February ===
- 5 February – Former National Party leader Don Brash's resignation from Parliament takes effect.
- 5 February – Google removes a number of posts from a blog called CYFSWATCH NEW ZEALAND, at the behest of the government, who allege the blog invites users to 'name and shame' staff at the New Zealand Department of Child, Youth and Family Services.
- 7 February – former Immigration Minister Tuariki Delamere appears in court to face allegations that he had devised a fraudulent scheme designed to help ineligible Chinese migrants immigrate to New Zealand. He is cleared of all charges on 2 March.
- 9 February – Ahmed Zaoui's request to have his family join him in New Zealand is turned down by the Minister of Immigration.
- 10 February – A tour bus crashes near Tokoroa injuring several of the Korean tourists on board.
- 13 February – Disgraced MP Taito Phillip Field is expelled from the Labour Party caucus after announcing in an interview that he will stand for election at the next general election, either with Labour or as an independent.
- 28 February – Parliament passes the Unsolicited Electronic Messages Act 2007, making spam originating from within New Zealand illegal.

=== March ===
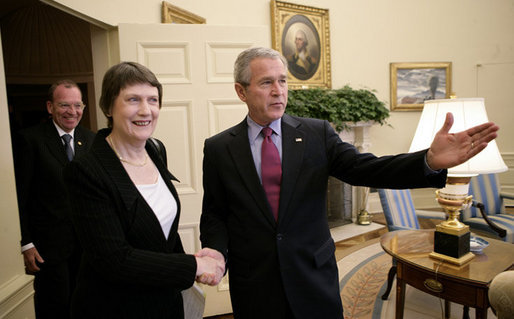
U.S. President George W. Bush welcomes with New Zealand Prime Minister Helen Clark at the Oval Office, on 21 March 2007.

- 1 March – for the second time in twelve months, former deputy Police Commissioner Clint Rickards and two accomplices are cleared of sexual assault charges.
- 18 March – Mount Ruapehu's crater lake overflows resulting in a lahar. No major damage is reported.
- 21–22 March – New Zealand Prime Minister Helen Clark meets U.S. President George W. Bush in Washington, D.C.

=== April ===
- 1 April – Severe flooding in Northland results in millions of dollars' worth of damage.
- 2 April – Auckland Hospital reveals that one of its patients is suffering from Creutzfeldt–Jakob disease, and that up to 43 of its patients could be at risk.
- 3 April – the Bazley Report into police conduct is released, citing "disgraceful" conduct among policemen going back to 1979. The release of the report prompts a public apology from police commissioner Howard Broad.

=== May ===
- 10 May – The Privy Council quashes the conviction of David Bain for the May 1995 murder of his family in Dunedin, ordering a retrial, alleging a "substantial miscarriage of justice". He is released on bail five days later.
- 16 May – Parliament passes the Crimes (Abolition of Force as a Justification for Child Discipline) Amendment Act, (commonly misrepresented as the "anti-smacking bill"), removing 'reasonable force' as a justification in child assault cases. United Future MP Gordon Copeland quits his party after United's leader Peter Dunne votes in favour of the bill. Copeland announces his intention to form a new party called Future New Zealand.
- 30 May – Folole Muliaga dies after the power to her Auckland home is disconnected by electricity company Mercury Energy for failure to pay her overdue account; Mrs Muliaga was dependent on an oxygen life support machine.

=== June ===
- 6 June – Emirates Team New Zealand wins the Louis Vuitton Cup 5-0 against Luna Rossa in Valencia.
- 7 June – The Reserve Bank intervenes in the currency market by selling New Zealand Dollars to try to halt the increase in value of the currency. This was the first such intervention since the NZD was floated in 1985
- 14–15 June – The military government of Fiji expels New Zealand high commissioner Michael Green. The following day, Fairfax journalist Michael Field is deported.
- 21 June – The Solicitor General announces that David Bain, currently released on bail after the Privy Council quashed his convictions for the May 1995 murder of his family and siblings, will face a retrial in 2008.
- 21 June – A polar blast moving north over the South Island causes major disruptions and claims at least one life.

=== July ===
- 1 July – Introduction of several government reforms, including 20 hours funded childcare for 3- and 4-year-olds and the KiwiSaver retirement savings scheme.
- 2 July – Corporal Willie Apiata of the SAS is awarded the Victoria Cross for bravery under fire in Afghanistan. This is the first time the VC has been awarded to a New Zealander since World War II.
- 4 July – The first of a swarm of tornadoes hits New Plymouth. No injuries are reported, but the tornadoes inflict major structural damage to buildings in a 140 km radius, and on 6 July, a seven-day state of emergency is declared in Taranaki.
- 11 July – Major storms cause flooding and cut off communities, leaving up to 50,000 people without power in Northland and the Coromandel Peninsula.
- 11 July – The Government greenlights oil and gas exploration worth over a billion dollars off in four areas of the Great South Basin off the Southland coast.
- 12 July – Two New Zealand oil workers kidnapped at gunpoint on 4 July in Nigeria's Niger Delta are released unharmed.
- 12 July – Spotless dispute – an industrial dispute between contracting company Spotless and 800 of their employees.
- 23 July – The first Rail Safety Week is held.
- 30 July – A state of emergency is declared in Otago due to flooding.
- July – The Springfield Doughnut is installed in Springfield as promotion for The Simpsons Movie.

=== August ===
- 25 August – 69 people are arrested following Undie 500 student riots in Dunedin.

=== October ===
- 13 October – Elections were held for all of New Zealand's city, district and regional councils, and all District Health Boards.
- 15 October – Police conduct a series of raids across the country, charging 17 people with various firearms offences. They state that they are acting in response to an alleged paramilitary-style training camp in Te Urewera.
- 16 October – A magnitude 6.7 earthquake strikes west of Milford Sound.
- 31 October – Cabinet reshuffle prepares Helen Clark's Labour government for the coming election year.

=== December ===
- 2 December – 96 medals, including 9 Victoria Crosses, are stolen from the Army Museum New Zealand.
- 20 December – A 6.8 magnitude earthquake strikes the town of Gisborne, causing severe damage to several buildings and one person to die of a heart attack.

== Holidays and observances ==
- 6 February – Waitangi Day
- 25 April – ANZAC Day
- 4 June – Queen's Birthday
- 16 June – Matariki
- 22 October – Labour Day

== Media, arts and literature ==
=== Music ===
- April = NZ Radio Awards
- 26–29 January – Auckland Folk Festival
- 1–31 May – New Zealand Music Month
- 31 May – Pacific Music Awards
- 1 June – Gold Guitar Awards (country music)
- 18 October – New Zealand Music Awards
- 6 November – Wellington International Jazz Festival

=== Performing arts ===
- Benny Award presented by the Variety Artists Club of New Zealand to Ray Woolf MNZM.

=== Television ===
- 30 January – Bill Ralston quits his post as head of News and Current Affairs at TVNZ, having presided over a slide in the 6 pm bulletin's ratings and revenues. (stuff)
- 13 April – Television New Zealand announces a round of job cuts, with at least 140 staff being made redundant; the worst hit area being its news division. (TV3)
- 2 May – The Freeview digital broadcasting platform is officially switched on. (One News)
- 29 May – TV personality Suzanne Paul and her partner Stefano Olivieri win the third series of Dancing with the Stars.

=== Film ===
- 3 February – A remastered edition of This is New Zealand, shot by Wellington filmmaker Hugh Macdonald for Expo '70 in Osaka, Japan wins a bronze medal in the New York Festivals Film and Video Competition. (scoop)

=== Internet ===
- 1 March – Telecom New Zealand and Yahoo! launch Yahoo!Xtra, a joint venture web portal replacing XtraMSN (Yahoo!Xtra), (wikinews)
- 9 August – Telecom begins unbundling the local loop, opening exchanges in Ponsonby and Glenfield to competitors.

== Sport ==
=== Cricket ===
see also 2007 in cricket

- 7 December 2006 – 9 January 2007 – Sri Lanka tours New Zealand.
- 12 January – 13 February: The Commonwealth Bank Series, a three-way cricket tournament between New Zealand, Australia and England takes place in Australia. The Black Caps are eliminated on 6 February.
- 26 January – Nathan Astle announces his retirement from international cricket.
- 28 January – Jacob Oram hits an unbeaten 101 off 72 balls against Australia, the fastest ever one-day century by a New Zealander
- 16–20 February – the best of three Chappell–Hadlee trophy series between the Black Caps and Australia is played; New Zealand win the series 3-0. Craig McMillan hits a century off 67 balls in the final match, beating the record set on 28 January for the fastest one day century by a New Zealander. (NZ Herald)
- 11 March – 28 April – The 2007 Cricket World Cup is held in the West Indies; The Black Caps make it to the semifinals before being beaten by Sri Lanka.
- 24 April – Stephen Fleming resigns as New Zealand's One Day International captain.

=== Horse racing ===
==== Harness racing ====
- New Zealand Trotting Cup: Flashing Red
- Auckland Trotting Cup: Flashing Red

=== Motorsport ===
- 21 January – A round of the international A1 Grand Prix is held at Taupō, with Germany winning both races.
- 31 August – 3 September – the Rally of New Zealand, a leg of the World Rally Championship is won by Marcus Grönholm who beat Sébastien Loeb by the narrowest margin in WRC history, 0.3 seconds.

=== Netball ===
- 5 April – 22 June – The final season of the National Bank Cup competition is played. The Southern Sting, win, beating the Northern Force 50-49 in the final. From 2008 the National Bank Cup and its sister competition in Australia will be replaced by the ANZ Championship.
- 10–17 November – The 2007 Netball World Championships takes place in West Auckland. The champs were originally to be held in Fiji, but the hosting rights were withdrawn after that country's military coup. The Silver ferns come 2nd after losing to Australia in the final.

=== Rugby league ===
see also Rugby league in New Zealand and Rugby league in 2007

- 17 March – 30 September – the NRL Telstra Premiership is played in various venues across Australia and New Zealand.
- 20 April – The eighth annual ANZAC Test between Australia and New Zealand is played at Suncorp Stadium in Brisbane, with Australia runaway winners, 30 to 6.
- April–September – the Bartercard Cup domestic competition will be played
- October – the New Zealand national rugby league team will tour Great Britain to celebrate one hundred years of rugby league in New Zealand.

=== Rugby union ===
- 2 February – 19 May – The 2007 Super 14 season was played. For only the second time in Super Rugby, no New Zealand team makes the final.
- 2–3 February – The 2007 Wellington Sevens, the third leg of the IRB Sevens World Series take place at Westpac Stadium. Samoa win the tournament. (stuff)
- 21 July – The All Blacks win the 2007 Tri Nations Series and the Bledisloe Cup with a 26–12 win over Australia at Eden Park. (BBC News)
- 26 July – The first game of the 2007 Air New Zealand Cup will be played.
- 8 September – The All Blacks begin their quest to win the 2007 Rugby World Cup in France, with their first game against Italy in Marseille.

=== Rowing ===
- 22–24 June – the second of three legs of the World Rowing Cup is held in Amsterdam. New Zealand rowers win three gold and three silver medals. (NZ Herald)

=== Shooting ===
- Ballinger Belt –
  - Mark Buchanan (Australia)
  - Bill Tabor (Karori), second, top New Zealander

=== Soccer ===
- 19 March – A slot in the A-League previously held by the New Zealand Knights is awarded to a Wellington consortium. (NZ Herald). On 28 March, it is revealed the new team will be called the Wellington Phoenix, and they will play their home games at Wellington's Westpac Stadium. Their first regular season fixture, a home game against the Melbourne Victory on 26 August.
- 10–30 September – The New Zealand women's national football team will compete in the 2007 FIFA Women's World Cup in China, their first appearance in a Women's World Cup since 1991.
- The Chatham Cup is won by Central United who beat Western Suburbs FC 0–0 in the final (10-9 on penalties).

=== Tennis ===
- 6 January: Top seed Jelena Janković wins the ASB Classic women's pro tournament held in Auckland, beating Vera Zvonareva (5th seed) 7-6 (11–9) 5–7 6-3 in the final.
- 13 January: Third seed David Ferrer of Spain wins the Heineken Open men's pro tournament held in Auckland, after he defeated top seed and compatriot Tommy Robredo 6-4 6-2

=== Yachting ===
- 6 June – Team New Zealand wins the Louis Vuitton Cup in Valencia, Spain, thus winning the right to challenge for the America's Cup.
- 23 June – 3 July – Team New Zealand faces Alinghi in a best of nine series to determine the winner of the 2007 America’s Cup. Alinghi are the eventual winners, by five races to two.

== Births ==
- 22 January – Lucia Georgalli, snowboarder
- 3 July – Gabriel Sloane-Rodrigues, association footballer
- 10 October – Jimmy Choux, Thoroughbred racehorse
- 21 October – Terror To Love, Standardbred racehorse
- 22 November – Zack Scoular, motor-racing driver
- 7 December – Gold Ace, Standardbred racehorse

== Deaths ==
=== January ===
- 9 January – Norman Rumsey, optical systems designer (born 1922)
- 16 January – Atareta Maxwell, kapa haka leader (born 1956)
- 21 January – Mina Foley, opera singer (born 1930)

=== February ===
- 4 February
  - John Head, teacher and disarmament campaigner (born 1927)
  - Gerald Loft, Roman Catholic bishop (born 1933)
- 5 February – Leo T. McCarthy, politician and businessman (born 1930)
- 6 February
  - Helen Duncan, politician (born 1941)
  - Doug Gailey, rugby league player (born c.1947)
- 7 February – Alan MacDiarmid, chemist, Nobel Laureate (born 1927)
- 22 February – Harold Tyrie, track and field athlete and coach (born 1915)

=== March ===
- 7 March – Graham Botting, cricketer (born 1915)
- 13 March – John McMillan, economic theorist and applied microeconomist (born 1951)
- 23 March – Super Impose, thoroughbred racehorse (foaled 1984)
- 26 March – Mary Mitchell, athlete (born 1912)
- 27 March – Nancy Adams, botanist, botanical artist and museum curator (born 1926)

=== April ===
- 2 April – Jeannie Ferris, politician (born 1941)
- 10 April – Florence Finch, supercentenarian, New Zealand longevity record holder (born 1893)
- 13 April
  - Don Selwyn, actor and film director (born 1935)
  - Dame Marie Clay, educational literacy researcher (born 1926)
- 15 April – Ted Meuli, cricketer (born 1926)
- 16 April – Frank Bateson, astronomer (born 1909)
- 26 April – Harry Lapwood, soldier and politician (born 1915)
- 29 April
  - George, Jack Russell terrier (born c.1997)
  - Dick Motz, cricketer (born 1940)

=== May ===
- 2 May
  - Brad McGann, film director and screenwriter (born 1964)
  - Henare te Ua, radio broadcaster and oral historian (born 1933)
- 8 May – David Farquhar, composer and music academic (born 1928)
- 13 May – Kate Webb, journalist (born 1943)
- 15 May – Brian Nordgren, rugby league player (born 1925)
- 19 May – Dean Eyre, politician and diplomat (born 1914)
- 20 May – Dame Jean Herbison, educationalist (born 1923)
- 25 May – Arwon, thoroughbred racehorse (foaled 1973)
- 27 May – Jack Kerr, cricket player and administrator (born 1910)
- 29 May – Folole Muliaga, schoolteacher (born c.1963)

=== June ===
- 3 June – Gordon Gostelow, actor (born 1925)
- 8 June – Phil Amos, politician (born 1925)
- 10 June
  - Augie Auer, meteorologist (born 1940)
  - Witarina Harris, actor, entertainer, Māori language advocate (born 1906)
- 14 June – Haydn Sherley, radio personality (born 1924)
- 20 June
  - Sir Trevor Henry, jurist (born 1902)
  - Reginald Johansson, field hockey player (born 1925)
- 23 June – Brian Blacktop, lawyer (born 1937)
- 24 June – Joey Sadler, rugby union player (born 1914)
- 30 June – Bruce Greensill, rugby union player (born c.1942)

=== July ===
- 7 July – Keith Gudsell, rugby union player (born 1924)
- 8 July – Jimmy Ell, cricketer (born 1915)
- 21 July – Bill McLennan, rugby league player (born 1927)
- 22 July – Jarrod Cunningham, rugby union player (born 1968)

=== August ===
- 7 August – Sir Angus Tait, electronics innovator and businessman (born 1919)
- 13 August – Sir Robertson Stewart, industrialist (born 1913)
- 15 August – Geoffrey Orbell, rediscoverer of the takahē (born 1908)
- 20 August – Chas Poynter, politician, mayor of Wanganui (1986–2004) (born 1939)
- 22 August – Graeme Hansen, equestrian (born 1934)
- 28 August – Nikola Nobilo, winemaker (born 1913)
- 29 August – Sir James Fletcher, industrialist (born 1914)

=== September ===
- 1 September – Sir Roy McKenzie, standardbred horse breeder and trainer, philanthropist (born 1922)
- 3 September – Syd Jackson, Māori activist and trade unionist (born 1938)
- 8 September – Graham Condon, athlete, politician and disability advocate (born 1949)
- 13 September – Whakahuihui Vercoe, Bishop of Aotearoa and Archbishop of New Zealand (born 1928)
- 19 September – Neil Morrison, politician (born 1938)
- 25 September – Colin Webster-Watson, sculptor and poet (born 1926)
- 30 September – Cyril Eastlake, rugby league player (born 1930)

=== October ===
- 3 October – John Buxton, rugby union player (born 1933)
- 18 October – Joe Sellwood, Australian rules football player (born 1911)
- 24 October – Ian Middleton, novelist (born 1928)
- 25 October – Johnny Dodd, rugby league player (born 1928)
- 28 October – Stuart Sidey, politician, mayor of Dunedin (1959–65) (born 1908)

=== November ===
- 2 November – Malcolm Harrison, clothing designer, textile artist (born 1941)
- 9 November – Dennis List, poet, editor and novelist (born 1946)
- 17 November – Meg Campbell, poet (born 1937)
- 21 November – Noel McGregor, cricketer (born 1931)
- 23 November – Pat Walsh, rugby union player and selector (born 1936)

=== December ===
- 3 December – John Belgrave, public servant, Ombudsman (born 1940)
- 15 December – Peter Eastgate, rugby union player (born 1927)
- 16 December – John Macdonald, forensic psychiatrist (born 1920)
- 20 December – Ron Horsley, rugby union player (born 1932)
- 23 December – Kevin Sinclair, journalist and author (born 1942)
- 25 December – John Hayes, cricketer (born 1927)
- 26 December – Helen Smith, politician (born 1927)

== See also ==
- List of years in New Zealand
- Timeline of New Zealand history
- History of New Zealand
- Military history of New Zealand
- Timeline of the New Zealand environment
- Timeline of New Zealand's links with Antarctica

For world events and topics in 2007 not specifically related to New Zealand see: 2007
