= Folole Muliaga =

- Born: c. 1963
- Died: 29 May 2007; Māngere, Auckland, New Zealand
- Occupation: Schoolteacher
- Spouse: Lopaavea Muliaga
- Children: Ietitaia; Desmond; Mowena; Eden

Folole Muliaga (c. 1963 – 29 May 2007) was a Samoan schoolteacher living in Māngere, Auckland, New Zealand. She was terminally ill with obesity-related heart and lung disease and using a home oxygen machine. She died less than three hours after the electricity supply from state-owned Mercury Energy was disconnected to her house due to an outstanding balance. The circumstances of her death brought the case to national attention in New Zealand and internationally.

== Family background ==
Muliaga; her husband, Lopaavea Muliaga, and four children, Ietitaia (aged 20 at the time of her death), Desmond (18), Eden (7), had moved to New Zealand in 2000, looking for a better life. A further child was born in New Zealand, and was aged five at the time of her death. She had a University diploma in early childhood education, and was a pre-school teacher.

== Illness and death ==
On 11 May, Muliaga was sent home from Auckland's Middlemore Hospital suffering from terminal cardiomyopathy, after being in hospital since late March. Doctors believed that she did not have much longer to live. She had first been admitted to hospital in 2002, with acute respiratory failure, related to her "gross obesity". On previous occasions she had used traditional Samoan health care instead of prescribed medication. Her doctors say that when she was discharged, she was not so ill that the oxygen machine was critical to her survival. Over the past five years, she had been told repeatedly that her diet and lifestyle needed to change for her health to improve. The doctor who treated her the first time she was admitted to hospital believed that she only had one to three years, the normal prognosis for patients in her condition. He also stated that for people with such severe obesity (Muliaga weighed up to 210 kg), it is difficult to lose such weight permanently as it is a "disease to gain as much weight as she did". In conjunction with the oxygen concentrator, she had used a BiPAP machine.

On 29 May, a contractor for VirCom EMS was sent by Mercury Energy to the Muliaga's house to disconnect the electricity supply. There was an outstanding balance of NZ$168.40. The family had made two payments totalling $106.90 in the last month on their balance, but according to statements later made by Mercury, the outstanding balance was accruing faster than the family were paying it off. The $168 did not include the current month's charges of $136. The family believed they had to June 13 to pay the total amount. In early May, Mr Muliaga had contacted Mercury Energy while his wife was in hospital to discuss the overdue account. But due to the Privacy Act, they would only discuss it with the account holder, who was Mrs Muliaga.

Up until she qualified as a teacher, the TB and Chest Association, paid $35 of the electricity bill. While she had been studying, her husband had supported the family on an income of $24,000 per year. They had used high-interest (30%), short-term loans to get needed money. Once Muliaga had qualified as a teacher, the combined income rose to $60,000. However, when she became ill and had to be hospitalised in early 2007, the family's income was once again reduced to $24,000 per year.

According to the eldest son, the contractor arrived at about 11 a.m. and the family made him aware of Muliaga's medical condition. The family have stated they told the contractor that the oxygen supply needed electricity to continue, but he responded that he was "just doing my job". The contractor said that he saw a medical tube to her nose, but it was not connected to any equipment. He claims that he was not made aware of any need for the oxygen supply. According to the Herald on Sunday newspaper, the police investigation into the death confirmed the contractor's story.

The telephone service to the house had already been disconnected. Although Telecom would not go into specifics of the Muliaga's case, they did state that in general they would "talk to customers and offer budget advice and refer them to budgeting services". This lack of a working telephone in the house meant it was too late to save Muliaga when emergency services were finally contacted. Also compounding the issue was that Muliaga told her sons not to worry, and instructed them not to call an ambulance. When she passed out at 1:30 p.m., the two sons decided to ring but they had to go to an elderly neighbour. Muliaga's husband stated that "as you know Samoans are very respectful of imposing on others, especially if the neighbours aren't Samoan — they're Papalagi [European]".

It was her nephew, Brenden Sheehan, who brought the case to national attention. He said he went to the media the night of the death in the hopes of finding an after-hours number for Mercury Energy to get the electricity supply reconnected. That same evening, a Victim Support worker also telephoned Mercury requesting that the electricity be reconnected. A supervisor at the call-centre said that "she may have passed away in the last couple of days but… I know it's been hard but it's irrelevant" and that the electricity would not be reconnected until further payments were made.

== Funeral ==
Her funeral at the Samoan Assemblies of God in New Zealand Incorporated Headquarters (Samani Pulepule Convention Centre) was attended by about 1,000 people. Mourners included Prime Minister Helen Clark and Manukau Mayor Barry Curtis, and executives from Mercury Energy, including then chief executive Doug Heffernan. Her casket donated by Sovereign Industries, and Mercury Energy provided a cheque for $10,000 to the cost of the funeral. A large group of executives from the company and its parent visited the Muliaga's home on June 1 to offer their condolences. This was the same day that the Prime Minister also visited.

== Aftermath ==
The actions of the police, who conducted an investigation into the death, upset the family. The family claimed that police showed had a "lack of cultural awareness" and had "institutionalised racism", conducting the interviews in English, the second language of the family. These allegations were denied by the police, who said when they spoke to the two eldest sons, the interview was conducted by a Samoan officer, and the men chose to speak in English.

The police announced 12 June that there was no evidence to justify any charge against the company, contractor or staff member involved.

The Coroner ruled Muliaga died of natural causes relating to being morbidly obese - but the stress of having her power disconnected and not being able to use her oxygen machine contributed to her death. He criticized Mercury and Manukau DHB for their part in her death.

The contractor was placed on stress leave and received counselling. The family have stated they do not want any disciplinary or criminal actions taken against him and invited him to the funeral. They are also against the police investigation into the matter, believing that the "public interest is not served by a criminal investigation to blame any individual for this tragedy", instead believing any investigation should be into the electricity companies and their practices.

Mercury Energy sent a letter to its 300,000 customers on 16 June, signed by Carole Durbin, chairwoman of Mighty River Power, stating that "Mercury Energy and Mighty River Power deeply regret what occurred".

The Electricity Commission (now the Electricity Authority) issued new guidelines in July 2007 stating consumers who are dependent on electricity for critical medical support should state so to their electricity retailer and are not to be disconnected for non-payment. However, it also recommended that medically dependent consumers should regularly test their back-up batteries and have an emergency plan in case of a prolonged blackout .
