= Samani Pulepule =

Samoan minister

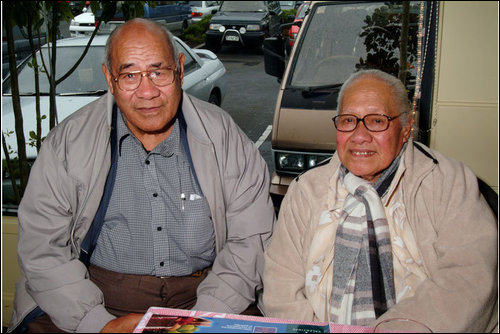
- Samani and Sapapali'i Pulepule
- Born: Samani-Sisipeni Pulepule; 13 October 1923; Solosolo, Upolu, Territory of Western Samoa
- Died: 4 June 2013 (aged 89); Māngere, Auckland, New Zealand
- Occupations: Minister; Evangelist Presiding President Samoan Assemblies of God
- Years active: 1960–2011
- Successor: Reverend Motu Matia
- Spouse: Sapapali'i Pulepule

Samani Pulepule (13 October 1923 – 4 June 2013), formally His Eminence and Most Reverend, Chief Apostle Dr. Samani Pulepule was a Samoan minister from the early 1950s in the Assemblies of God movement. Dr Pulepule was also the Chief Apostle of the Samoan Assemblies of God in New Zealand for over 40 years and was elected as the World Chairman of the Samoan Assemblies of God International. The Tokelauan Assemblies of God and Tuvaluan Assemblies of God also came under his leadership.

He was the senior pastor for the Grey Lynn Samoan Assemblies of God congregation in Auckland, New Zealand. It was one of the fastest growing and largest Samoan congregations in the world. Pulepule also planted over 100 churches throughout New Zealand, over 60 in Australia, and elsewhere where Samoan communities were present.

Rev. Pulepule played a pivotal role in mission work, particularly in Samoa and American Samoa, where the District Council of the Assemblies of God comprises almost 200 congregations. His influence extended to the mainland USA, fostering the growth of over 90 Samoan congregations, predominantly along the west coast, with an additional 50 in Hawaii and Alaska.

The World Tongan Assemblies of God fellowship emerged through Pulepule's guidance, as Tongan leaders sought his assistance in creating a global movement. In 2005, a significant development occurred in the New Zealand Samoan movement he led, resulting in 40 churches remaining under the Assemblies of God in New Zealand umbrella, while 45 churches became an autonomous fellowship under his leadership.

Since 2005, the church under Pulepule's direction has experienced substantial growth, increasing from 45 to over 80 congregations. It remains the fastest-growing Pentecostal movement in New Zealand. However, on September 25, 2011, Pulepule officially resigned from his roles as Chief Apostle, General Superintendent, and World Chairman in the Samoan Assemblies of God movement. The event was attended by former General Superintendents of the Assemblies of God in New Zealand, global Assemblies of God leaders, the mayor of Auckland, the Auckland City Council, Members of Parliament, and leaders from other Pentecostal denominations. All paid tribute to Pulepule and the First Lady.

His wife, First Lady Sapapali'i Pulepule, died on 21 May 2013. Pulepule died two weeks later on 4 June 2013. Thousands attended both memorial services. The New Zealand Government also presented gifts, and the National flag of New Zealand was draped over their coffins.

== Early life and history ==
Pulepule was born on October 13, 1923, in the village of Solosolo, Samoa (formerly Western Samoa) to Tupolesava Pulepule Matu'u II and Aimama Tuala Tagaloa of Saluafata who were members of the L.M.S. in Solosolo. He has 9 siblings and is the second eldest child.

He became a teacher at Avele College, and later met his wife Sapapali'i, both were members of the CCCS (Congregational Christian Church of Samoa or L.M.S.). By then the Assemblies of God from American Samoa had already begun missions in the Samoan islands.

In 1963, Makisua and Mauosamoa Fatialofa were holding revival meetings in Lotopa. It was at these meetings that Samani and Sapapalii were saved. Barry Smith, a school teacher at that time who worked with Samani at Samoa College, had brought them to the meetings, and it was from that day on, Pulepule decided to devote the rest of his life to the church and its purposes. (Pentecost to the uttermost: History of the Assemblies of God: Dr. Tavita Pagaialii, Pg.53)

In 1965, he was appointed to lead Faleasi'u Assembly of God (the first Assemblies of God church in Samoa). In 1967, he moved to New Zealand.

Pulepule and his wife planted a church in the Grey Lynn area in Auckland, and the church grew rapidly, having to extend their church more than five times just to cater to the 500-plus-strong congregation. In 1967, Grey Lynn Samoan A/G was the first ethnic church to align with the Assemblies of God in New Zealand. The 20 or so Samoan Pentecostal churches thought their church would become more effective if they all came together, and at that time these Pentecostal churches had united and officially became the Samoan Assemblies of God in New Zealand under the leadership of Pulepule, there he was elected as the superintendent of the Samoan movement in New Zealand, and it soon became the fastest-growing church in New Zealand.

In 1992, the Samoan Assemblies of God Convention Centre officially opened. The center was named the "Samani Pulepule Convention/Community Centre" and it seats up to 4,000 people.

In 1999, the Grey Lynn church relocated to Mt. Roskill, where it purchased an old factory building for NZ$1.6 million, and renamed their church from Grey Lynn to Auckland Samoan Assembly of God, which has been the church of the general superintendent for over 40 years.

== Family and heritage ==
During their time in ministry, Pulepule and his wife had three children: Onesemo, Sera and Talalelei. Onesemo moved to Australia and founded the Melbourne Samoan Assembly of God church, and in 2001 was elected as the General Superintendent of the Samoan Assemblies of God in Australia. All are Samoan-born. His brother Taulapapa Mama Pulepule is also currently pastor for the Falefa Assembly of God in Samoa and has been for several years, His younger brother Ieti is also a pastor for the Paraparaumu church. His other brother Tautiaga (who holds the Magele of Lufilufi & Lemusu of Solosolo titles) and sisters Masina, Tivalo & Lanuola. Other siblings who died at a young age were Niu, Levao, Momoemaluapia.

== Homegoing celebration ==
A three-day homegoing celebration was held from 13 to 15 June 2013. The first celebration service was a pastor's celebration service held at the church he founded, Grey Lynn Auckland Samoan Assembly of God, eulogies were made by local pastors, as well as the executive council of the Samoan Assemblies of God in New Zealand. The second celebration service was held at the Samani Pulepule Convention Centre, a complex which seats 4,000 people, eulogies were made by family members, and a special musical from the Auckland Samoan A/G church. In attendance were the Tongan Assemblies of God, a church that Pulepule had helped with becoming a worldwide fellowship, also in attendance were the former Assemblies of God Leaders from around the world, local members of Parliament, and leaders of other major denominations. The third service was the Assemblies of God National/International service. This was held at the Auckland Samoan Assemblies of God, and a special presentation from the New Zealand Government, the National and Labour Parties were made to Pulepule's family. Tagata Pasifika, a well-known television news broadcast had special coverage of the homegoing services. Pulepule was buried next to his wife, who had died two weeks earlier. Thousands of people from all over the world gathered to celebrate a life of devotion and faithfulness. Sunday services the following day were spread out across the Auckland metropolitan area to cater to the thousands of dignitaries and pastors from around the world. Over 4,000 people gathered every night of the three-day celebration.

== Leadership ==
From between 1962 and 1963, Pulepule became the third pastor of Faleasi'u Assembly of God; he then moved to New Zealand in 1963 and founded the Grey Lynn Samoan A/G and in 1999, Pulepule founded the Auckland Samoan Assembly of God, a church that grew from 4 families to over 500 adherents in 10 years.

He was also elected as chairman of the Worldwide Fellowship following the death of Pastor Max Haleck, Jr. in 2006. From 2006 to 2011, Pulepule held the post of world chairman, until he resigned in September 2011. Succeeding him in this role is his son, Onesemo Pulepule, who was called into office at the resignation of his father.

Preceded by	Chief Apostle; 1967–2011	Succeeded by Pastor Motu Matia

== Cultural reformation ==
In an interview with ABC Australia presenter Geraldine Coutts, New Zealand MP William Sio said that Dr. Pulepule had genuine concern for the people he led. In a question asked by Coutts mentioning the way the church went about things with traditional Samoan practices and the pioneering role he had had in the change, she asked about the practices in particular were rejected. Sio replied that in the case of weddings and funerals etc., it was the exchange of fine mats. And often money and food which puts a burden on the extended family. He found that even though the practice still exists, it has been somewhat modified without the extravagance they were accustomed to and making it more in line with what the communities could afford.

This played a key role in the church's rapid growth. People were drawn to his genuine concern for their wellbeing spiritually and physically. His message to the worldwide fellowship was received with a rousing support. Dr. Pulepule will be remembered because he was simply a servant. The Samoan congregations will never forget the time where the Te Puke Samoan A/G church were preparing to bless their new church when a few members of the church were in a fatal car accident, a father and two sons died leaving a widow and their youngest child. During the service where a love offering was collected for Dr. Pulepule, he stopped the service and collected a love offering for the widow and her child. These were one of many great things Pulepule had done, and one of the many reasons he was admired and known as the spiritual father of the movement.
