= Samoan Assemblies of God =

Samoan Assemblies of God International
- Classification: Protestant
- Orientation: Pentecostal, Evangelical
- Polity: Congregational-Presbyterian polity
- Leader: General Superintendent Reverend Tu'ugasala Fuga (USA)
- Associations: World Assemblies of God
- Region: Worldwide
- Founder: The Late Reverend Ieti Mageo of American Samoa
- Origin: 1967; American Samoa
- Branched from: Assemblies of God USA
- Congregations: 530
- Members: 97,000

The Samoan Assemblies of God International (Samoan: Le Fa'apotopotoga a le Atua Samoa) or SAOG is a Pentecostal fellowship of churches. It reached the Western Islands and outer countries with large Samoan communities, such as New Zealand, America and Australia. It has over 530 churches worldwide with over 97,000 adherents.

The Samoan Assemblies of God fellowship is a registered movement under the Assemblies of God Worldwide, which together forms the largest Pentecostal movement worldwide. This Samoan fellowship of the Assemblies of God has over 300 credential ministers, over 10,000 lay preachers, and has 11 national fellowships worldwide which are Samoa, American Samoa, Tuvalu, Tokelau, United States, Australia, New Zealand, Germany and Fiji.

== History ==
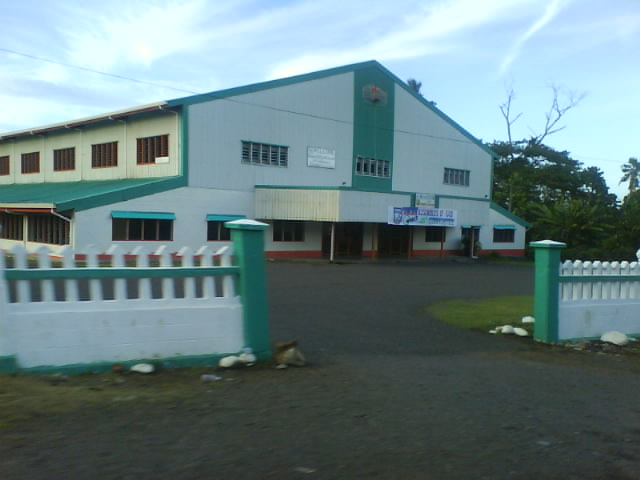
Lotopa Assembly of God Church, in Apia

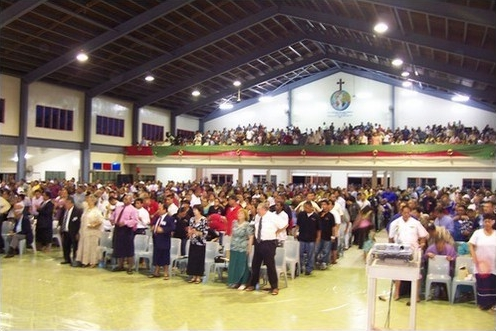
Lotopa Assembly of God Church worship service in Apia, Samoa

The Samoan Assemblies of God had its origins in a mission of the Assemblies of God USA in 1928. It was officially founded in 1928.

It was under the leadership of General Superintendent Pastor Max Haleck Jr. of American Samoa from 1976 to the year of his death in 2006, from there it was under the direction of Rev Samani Pulepule. Rev. Samani Pulepule, who has been the superintendent of the New Zealand Samoan Assemblies of God for over 30 years. In 2011 Rev. Pulepule resigned from all his posts, and his son Pastor Onesemo Pulepule became his successor. In the year 2014, Rev.Siaosi Mageo from American Samoa was elected as the Samoan Assemblies of God Worldwide Chairman and was succeeded by Reverend Joe Amosa from August 1, 2016, to May 31, 2018.

There are similar-sounding organizations that are distinct from the SAOG. These include the following: Samoan Independent Assemblies of God, and Assembly of God Church of Samoa.

== Beliefs ==
=== Fundamental doctrines ===
The central beliefs of the Samoan Assemblies of God are summarized in its Statement of Fundamental Truths. Numerous other Christian groups share some or all of these tenets, and some positions are considered more central to the faith than others. The following is a summary of these 16 non-negotiable Truths:

1. The Bible is inspired by God and is "the infallible, authoritative rule of faith and conduct".
2. There is only one true God who exists as a Trinity.
3. Jesus Christ is the Son of God and, as the second person of the Trinity, is God.
4. Man was created good by God but was separated from God through original sin.
5. Salvation "is received through repentance toward God and faith toward the Lord Jesus Christ". For more information, see the Core beliefs section below.
6. There are two ordinances. Believer's baptism by immersion is a declaration to the world of the believer's faith in Christ. The Lord's Supper is a symbolic remembrance of Christ's suffering and death.
7. Baptism in the Holy Spirit is a separate and subsequent experience following conversion. Spirit baptism brings empowerment to live an overcoming Christian life and to be an effective witness. For more information, see the Core beliefs section below.
8. Speaking in tongues is the initial physical evidence of the baptism in the Holy Spirit.
9. Sanctification is "an act of separation from that which is evil, and of dedication unto God". It occurs when the believer identifies with, and has faith in, Christ in his death and resurrection. It is not believed to be a "second definite work of grace" (see Finished Work), as in some other Pentecostal denominations, but is understood to be a process in that it requires continual yielding to the Holy Spirit.
10. The Church's mission is to seek and save all who are lost in sin; the Church is the Body of Christ and consists of all people who accept Christ, regardless of Christian denomination.
11. Divinely called and scripturally-ordained ministers serve the Church.
12. Divine healing of the sick is provided for in the atonement.
13. The "imminent and blessed hope" of the Church is its rapture preceding the bodily return of Christ to earth.
14. The rapture of the Church will be followed by the visible return of Christ and his reign on earth for a thousand years. For more information, see the Core beliefs section below.
15. There will be a final judgment and eternal damnation for the "wicked dead".
16. There will be future new heavens and a new earth "wherein dwelleth righteousness".

=== Core beliefs ===
The Samoan Assemblies of God considers salvation, baptism in the Holy Spirit with the evidence of speaking in tongues, divine healing and the Second Coming of Christ to be its four core beliefs.

==== Salvation ====
The Statement of Fundamental Truths states, "Man's only hope of redemption is through the shed blood of Jesus Christ the Son of God". The Assemblies of God holds the Arminian position on salvation; while it agrees with the Calvinist position that God is sovereign, at the same time, it believes that mankind has free will—free to accept or reject God's gift of salvation and eternal life. Therefore, the Assemblies of God disapproves of the doctrines of double predestination and the unconditional security of the believer which holds that once saved it is impossible for a person to be lost. Instead, the Assemblies of God believes that salvation is received and kept by faith, if faith in Christ is lost, then salvation is lost.

==== Baptism in the Holy Spirit ====
According to the Statement of Fundamental Truths, "All believers are entitled to and should ardently expect and earnestly seek" the baptism in the Spirit. It also states, "This was the normal experience of all in the early Christian Church". It is a separate experience from and occurs after salvation. This baptism gives to the receiver an "enduement of power for life and service, the bestowment of the gifts and their uses in the work of the ministry". There are four experiences listed in the Fundamental Truths that result from Spirit baptism: "overflowing fullness of the Spirit", "a deepened reverence for God", intensified consecration and dedication to God and his work, and "a more active love for Christ, for His Word and for the lost". The "initial physical sign" of having received this baptism is "speaking with other tongues as the Spirit of God gives them utterance". This experience initiates the believer in the use of spiritual gifts.

Baptism in the Holy Spirit with the evidence of speaking in tongues is not a requirement for membership or participation in an Assembly of God church. However, it is a requirement for ministerial licensing and ordination. The practical implication of this is that candidates for ministry who have not had this experience are not eligible for formal ministry. Given the congregational elements of AG polity, the culture of each Assembly of God church varies. In some churches, the practice of speaking in tongues is common while in others it rarely occurs.

An increasing minority of pastors has expressed concern that there is a lack of biblical support for the claim that Spirit baptism must always be accompanied with speaking in tongues. This concern corresponds with a decrease in the number of Assembly of God adherents reporting baptism in the Holy Spirit; according to the AG's Office of Statistics as of 2003 less than 50 percent of adherents had this experience. These challenges to the AG's traditional position were noted in a 2007 report by the AG's Spiritual Life Committee:

Yet, the distinctive doctrine that once united us has, in some circles, become a point of contention. We lament the increasing rarity of the gifts of the Spirit in our worship setting. We wonder where, in our busy church schedules, will people have an opportunity to tarry at the altars for a transforming Pentecostal experience?

Despite these challenges, the 53rd General Council in 2009 passed a resolution reaffirming the doctrine of initial physical evidence.

==== Divine healing ====
The Assemblies of God understands divine healing to have been provided for in the atonement. Looking to scripture, such as James 5 and Isaiah 53:5, the AG believes that Christians can pray for healing. Indeed, it believes scripture gives elders of the church the responsibility to pray "the prayer of faith" over the sick. It believes God can and does heal, but believes that God is sovereign and that, whether one is healed or not, a person's trust must be in God. It sees no conflict in trusting God for healing and receiving medical care. Healing testimonies regularly appear in the official publication, the Pentecostal Evangel, and prayer for healing and testimony commonly occur in church services.

While adamant that divine healing is a reality, the AG is not dogmatic on the subject of how one is healed. Margaret Poloma summarized this view stating, "Physical healing is not certain, automatic, or subject to formula. At the same time, it remains a tenet and practice of the Assemblies of God". It rejects the view that healing is caused or influenced by positive confession, as found in Word of Faith teachings; nevertheless, given the somewhat decentralized nature of the fellowship, these teachings have influenced some congregations.

==== Christ's Second Coming ====
The Statement of Fundamental Truths articles 13 and 14 articulate the Assemblies of God's official teaching on the return of Christ to Earth. It is a dispensationalist and premillennialist eschatology which includes the pre-Tribulation rapture of the Church—the "imminent and blessed hope". The rapture of the Church will be followed by Christ's visible return to earth and his reign of 1,000 years. This millennial reign will usher in the salvation of the nation of Israel and universal peace. The Assemblies of God is specifically opposed to the theologies and practices of universal salvation, setting dates for Christ's return, posttribulation rapture, and amillennialism.

=== Position statements ===
The Assemblies of God has released statements on various issues not addressed in the Statement of Fundamental Truths. These position papers are usually written by the Doctrinal Purity Commission, a standing committee of the General Council, which reviews and responds to issues referred to it by the Executive Presbytery. Position papers are not official positions of the Assemblies of God unless recommended by the Executive Presbytery and approved by the General Council. Position statements touch on biblical, theological, and social concerns.

- Abstinence from alcohol: On the consumption of alcohol, the AG calls on its members and adherents to live life-styles of total abstinence (see Christianity and alcohol).
- Apostles and Prophets: The Assemblies of God does not recognize titles or offices of "apostle" and "prophet". It does, however, believe there are those in the church who "exercise the ministry function of apostles and prophets". Apostolic functions relate to evangelizing previously unreached areas or people groups, while prophetic functions "occur when believers speak under the anointing of the Spirit to strengthen, encourage, or comfort". "Prophecy is a continuing gift of the Holy Spirit that is broadly distributed as the Spirit wills throughout Pentecostal churches". Predictive prophecy that proves false or prophecy which "departs from biblical truth" is false prophecy. The AG believes in the four ministry gifts of apostles, prophets, evangelists, and pastor/teachers but notes that there are no biblical instructions for the appointment of apostles and prophets today.
- Assisted suicide and abortion: Viewing all human life as sacred, the Assemblies of God opposes assisted suicide and abortion (unless the life of the mother is endangered). It believes scripture is silent on the use of contraception and therefore takes no position on this subject (see Christian views on suicide, Christianity and abortion and Christian views on contraception).
- Creation: The Assemblies of God believes that the account of creation in the book of Genesis "accurately communicates God's creation of the heavens and the earth" and that "the New Testament treats the creation and fall of Adam and Eve as historical events". It acknowledges that Christians will have different views on "the age of the earth, the age of humankind, and the ways in which God went about the creative processes" but urges them to "avoid divisiveness over debatable theories of creation". It also affirms that "God reveals himself both in Scripture and the created order" (see Creationism).
- Demon Possession: The Assemblies of God believes it is possible for people to be demon possessed and to be delivered by the "power of the Spirit, and the name of Jesus". However, it cautions against overemphasis on demonology and rejects the belief that Christians can be possessed by evil spirits.
- Ministry to the disabled: The AG teaches that people with disabilities are loved by God. They should be treated with dignity and fully included in the life of the Church.
- Divorce and remarriage: Officially, the AG disapproves of Christians divorcing for any cause except "fornication and adultery". Where these circumstances exist or where a Christian has been divorced by an unbeliever (see Pauline privilege), the AG allows "the question of remarriage to be resolved by the believer in the Light of God's Word". For Christians who were divorced and remarried before their conversion, it is recommended that local AG churches receive them as members. The General Council has offered this guideline for AG churches; however, churches are free to determine their own standards of membership with the result that many local churches will admit divorced and remarried persons as members even if the above conditions are not met (see Christian views on divorce).
- Gambling: The AG opposes gambling, believing that it is a disregard of responsible stewardship, involves a chance of gain at the expense and suffering of others, is inconsistent with the work ethic of scripture, and tends to be habit forming.
- Homosexuality: The fellowship takes the position that the biblical ideal of marriage is between one man and one woman and that the Bible condemns all sex outside of marriage, whether heterosexual or homosexual. Furthermore, it emphasizes that "believers who struggle with homosexual temptations must be encouraged and strengthened by fellow Christians" and that believers "must hold no malice toward, or fear, of homosexuals" but "reach out in humility and compassion" (see Christianity and homosexuality).
- Positive Confession: While the AG affirms that "All the blessings which God has for His people are received through faith" (including salvation, Spirit baptism, "divine preservation", "healing and provision of material needs", and the motivation to witness), it rejects the teaching that faith or "positive confession" "compels God's action". It holds that believers must consider the totality of scripture, consider adequately the will of God, recognize that they can expect suffering in life, and recognize the sovereignty of God. It also stresses the importance of persistent prayer, as opposed to simply confessing or "claiming" the promises of God.
- Women's role in ministry: The AG affirms the ministry of women in the church and allows them to be ordained and serve in pastoral roles (see Ordination of women).

== Statistics ==
The data shown below are primarily drawn from the World Christian Database (2006 ed) but also contains national denominational data and/or Census where indicated.

Country	Name	Total members (2006)
Alaska Section, USA	Samoan District Council	2,100
American Samoa	Assemblies of God in American Samoa	22,000
Australia	Samoan Assemblies of God in Australia Incorporated	9,000
Germany	Munich and Berlin Samoan Assemblies of God Germany	950
Hawaii Section, USA	Samoan District Council	7,000
United States	Samoan District Council	15,000
New Zealand	Samoan Assemblies of God in New Zealand	19,000
Samoa	Assemblies of God in Samoa	28,200
Tokelau	Samoan-Tokelauan Assemblies of God	260
Tuvalu	Assemblies of God Samoa in Tuvalu	3,500

== Megachurches ==
- Auckland Samoan Assembly of God Inc. (NZL)
- Brisbane Samoan Assembly of God (AUS)
- Faleasiu Assembly of God (SAM)
- Lotopa Breakthrough Church (SAM)
- Mangere Samoan Assembly of God Inc. (NZL)
- Melbourne Samoan Assembly of God (AUS)
- Mount Roskill Samoan Assembly of God Inc. (NZL)
- Napier Samoan Assembly of God Trustboard (NZL)
- Otara Samoan Assembly of God Inc. (NZL)
- Papatoetoe Samoan Assembly of God Trustboard (NZL)
- Porirua Samoan Assembly of God Trustboard (NZL)
- Ieova Irae Assembly of God (AMS)
- Multi-Cultural Worship Center (USA)
- Campbelltown Samoan Assembly of God (AUS)

== Affiliated fellowships ==
- Samoa – The Assemblies of God in Samoa
- American Samoa – The Assemblies of God in American Samoa
- New Zealand – The Samoan Assemblies of God in New Zealand
- Australia – The Samoan Assemblies of God in Australia Incorporated and/or Australian Samoan Christian Churches
- USA – The Samoan District Council of the Assemblies of God, USA, which covers all 50 states, Virgin Island and Puerto Rico. Its 5 current Sections:
- Northwest Section.
- Northern California Section.
- Southern California Section.
- Hawaii Section.
- Alaska Section.
- Tokelau – Samoan-Tokelauan Assemblies of God
- Tuvalu Islands – The Assemblies of God Samoa in Tuvalu
