= Bruce Greensill =

Australian rugby union player

Bruce Greensill (c. 1942 – 30 June 2007) was a rugby union player who represented both the Auckland Rugby Football Union and Sydney in rugby. He played club rugby for the College Rifles Club in Auckland and the Eastwood Rugby Club and founded the Forster-Tuncurry club on the Mid North Coast, New South Wales.

== New Zealand rugby career ==
Greensill started his club rugby career as a flanker with the College Rifles Club in Auckland. Initially, he played for the second XV rather than play for the first XV. In his first game, he played against future All Black captain Wilson Whineray and was awarded man of the match honours. Greensill played in a club premiership winning side and represented Auckland.

== Australian rugby player ==
Greensill moved to Sydney in 1967 and played club football for Eastwood in 1968. He was the first player to play 100 games of first grade rugby without playing for the lower grades. Greensill played for Sydney becoming one of two rugby players to have represented both Auckland and Sydney with Wallaby captain Greg Davis.

== Retirement ==
After entering the trucking industry in Sydney, Greensill bought a house in Forster and moved there to live. In 2003, he founded the Forster-Tuncurry Dolphins and was active in golden oldies rugby with first the Manning Mongrels of Taree and the Derelict Dolphins. Nick Farr-Jones made a presentation to Greensill for his services to rugby on the Mid North Coast.
