= Assembly of God Church of Samoa =

Pentecostal Independent Christian organization

Assembly of God Church of Samoa World-Wide (New Zealand, Australia, Samoa, America)
- Classification: Protestant
- Orientation: Pentecostal, Evangelical
- Polity: Congregational
- Chairman/Moderator: Apostle: Reverend Talosaga Kome
- Samoa Leader: Superintendent: Snr Pastor Tulua Tau Peti
- Australia Leader: Superintendent: Snr Pastor Apouani John Tapuala-Unasa
- New Zealand Leader: Superintendent: Snr Pastor Fereti Toleafoa
- Region: New Zealand, Australia, Samoa, America.
- Founder: Apostle: late Reverend Mesako Sanerivi
- Origin: 1974; Auckland, New Zealand.
- Separated from: New Zealand Samoan Assemblies of God in 1974
- Congregations: 50+
- Members: 3,500+

The Assembly of God Church of Samoa is a Pentecostal Independent Christian organization, founded in 1974, active in Samoa, Australia, USA and New Zealand.

== See also ==
- Samoan Assemblies of God in New Zealand Incorporated
