= Samoan Assemblies of God in New Zealand =

Pentacostal denomination in New Zealand

Samoan Assemblies of God
- Classification: Protestant
- Orientation: Pentecostal, Evangelical, Holiness
- Polity: Congregational-Presbyterian polity
- Chief Apostle: Most Reverend Apostle Motu Matia
- Director: Reverend Tafuna'i To'oseu Muaiava
- Region: New Zealand
- Founder: The Late Reverend Fereti Ama; The Late Evangelist Makisua Fatialofa; The Late Apostle Samani Pulepule; The Late Reverend Va'a Saipani
- Origin: 1964; Vivian Street, Wellington Samoan Assembly of God
- Separated from: Assemblies of God in New Zealand (separated 2005)
- Branched from: Assemblies of God Samoa
- Merger of: Samoan Assemblies International
- Separations: Assembly of God Church of Samoa (left in 1975); Samoan Church of God (left in 1985)
- Congregations: 126
- Members: 45,001

The New Zealand Samoan Assemblies of God (SA/G) or (SAOG), officially The General Council of the Samoan Assemblies of God in New Zealand Inc. are a group of Pentecostal congregations predominantly made up of Samoan people (the Tokelauan Assemblies of God also come under the Samoan jurisdiction). They are affiliated with the Samoan Assemblies of God church.

== History ==
It was established in New Zealand in the early 1960s by a group of Holiness/Pentecostals from Samoa bringing the message of Pentecostalism to their Samoan people living in New Zealand. Certain pioneers such as the late Reverend Makisua Fatialofa with his wife Evangelist Mauosamoa, the late Reverend Dr. Samani Pulepule with the late First Lady Sapapalii, along with the late Reverend Fereti Ama with his wife Lady Leausuone, were the foundation members of the first ethnically fellowship to align itself with the Assemblies of God in New Zealand (A/GNZ). It was this Samoan fellowship that contributed to the growth of the Assemblies of God in New Zealand making it the Nations fastest growing church. By 2005 there were 89 SA/G congregations throughout New Zealand and in that same year some members in the Samoan fellowship felt the need to be a self-governing body and formed its own constitution which split the SA/GNZ national body in two. In late November 2005, 45 churches left the A/GNZ umbrella and formed a break-away group (which now has over 80 churches in New Zealand), while 40 churches remained under the A/GNZ movement (and presently has over 70 churches), although this was the result both Samoan fellowships still work alongside one another.

The newly established movement remained under the leadership of the Most Reverend and Chief Apostle, the Late Dr. Samani Pulepule who served as the General Superintendent of the General Council since the 1960s. His position extended internationally and was also the Worldwide Chairman of the Samoan Assemblies of God International Fellowship. Dr. Pulepule was a member of the Executive Council in the A/GNZ (according to the constitution there is a seat in the Executive Council reserved for a Samoan representative which Dr. Pulepule held from 1967 to 2011). Dr. Pulepule also was the founder and senior pastor of the Samoan A/G in Grey Lynn who officially changed their name to Auckland Samoan A/G in 1998, this church had weekly attendance of over 800 people. On Sunday 29 September 2011, Dr. Pulepule formally retired from his posts in the Assemblies of God movement and was commended for the service of over 40 years in the movement. In early winter of 2013, the Chief Apostle and the First Lady died within a week. During the 2012 Business Conference, the General Council elected Reverend Motu Mati'a and First Lady Silaumua to lead the National Church. However, in 2016 more changes were made in the movement and it is now under the direction of the newly elected General Superintendent, The Most Reverend Tafuna'i Muaiava and First Lady Vāepa.

The Samoan congregations who remained under the A/GNZ umbrella, elected Reverend Aila'ula'u Faletutulu as the new Samoan representative in the Executive Council. This group of churches are known as the Assemblies of God in New Zealand (Samoan Churches). Reverend Faletutulu and Lady Nancy, along with Evangelist Mauosamoa Fatialofa are the senior pastors of the Napier Samoan A/G. Reverend Faletutulu served as the National President of the Youth Department for a number of years until in late 2005 he was elected as the new Samoan Overseer.

The Samoan Assemblies of God in New Zealand should not be confused with the Assembly of God Church of Samoa in New Zealand, who are group of 27 churches that had left the Samoan Assemblies of God in 1974 due to the dissatisfaction of one local minister of having the Samoan churches align with the Assemblies of God movement, wanting the Samoan churches to be run by the Samoan people. He formed an independent group of churches formally known as the Assembly of God Church of Samoa in New Zealand. This group of churches served under the leadership of the late Pastor Mesako Sanerivi who formed and encouraged this break away group. Apostle Reverend Talosaga Kome has taken this post since 2011.

=== COVID-19 pandemic ===
On 23 August 2021, the Samoan Assemblies of God's Māngere church in South Auckland was identified as a location of interest in the Delta variant community outbreak in Auckland that month. A COVID-19 positive individual had attended a church service on 15 August attended by 500 people. By 24 August, 58 cases had been linked to the Māngere AOG church sub-cluster. According to Auckland Councillor Efeso Collins, congregants had received racist abuse.

By 7 October 2021, 386 people linked to the Māngere AOG church had tested positive for COVID-19. Following the death of a congregant from COVID-19 the previous day, local Samoan AOG leaders including First lady Rebekah Toleafoa and church spokesperson Jerome Mika urged members to vaccinate.

== Organisational structure ==
The Samoan Assemblies of God movement in New Zealand is made up of a grouping of local churches the members of which who are predominantly migrants from Samoa and their New Zealand born families, who share the religious beliefs of the Assemblies of God movement worldwide. The denomination has six Regional Councils, and operate under a mother-church of that district. These Regional Councils gather together as the General Council of Churches at the movements national convention annually, but gather regionally every 3 months. The Districts are as follows: North Auckland Conference, South Auckland Conference, North Central Conference (Waikato/Bay of Plenty), South Central Conference (Manawatū/Hawkes Bay), Wellington Conference and the South Island Conference (Nelson, Canterbury, Otago and SouthLand)

The Samoan Assemblies of God is an affiliated part of the Samoan Assemblies of God worldwide.

Megachurch – Mangere Samoan Assembly of God

They work co-operatively with the Samoan Assemblies of God churches of Samoa, American Samoa, Australia, Alaska, Hawaii and of Mainland USA, and with any other religious organisation in New Zealand that shares the same Christian beliefs as the Assemblies of God movement worldwide.

The Samoan Assemblies of God in New Zealand believe in the power and person of the Holy Spirit, a belief that reaches back over two thousand years of Church history to the day of Pentecost when the Christian Church was born.

The 20th century Pentecostals movement was born when students at a Bible School in Topeka, Kansas, came into the conclusion that the Biblical evidence of the Baptism in the Holy Spirit was speaking in other tongues. From that time, there have been spiritual revivals accompanied by Pentecostal phenomena, as in the Welsh Revival of 1904 and at Azusa St, Los Angeles in 1906. Pentecostals found it necessary to set up their own Church structures, one of which, is the Assemblies of God, now found in most countries throughout the world.

Whilst the religious belief is the foundation cornerstone of the Samoan Assemblies of God in New Zealand, the members and local churches forming the Samoan Assemblies of God acknowledge that daily administration of local churches requires the observance of legal, ethical, social, and cultural values of the societies in which the Samoan Assemblies of God in New Zealand operates.

The Samoan Assemblies of God movement in New Zealand started at Vivian St, Wellington in 1962 as a Pentecostal movement. The movement commenced in Auckland in 1964 by foundation members who were members of the Pentecostal movement from Samoa.

In 1964 the foundation Congregations in Wellington and Auckland adopted the name Samoan Assemblies of God in New Zealand and worked closely together.

In 1967, Dr. Samani Pulepule the former Chief Apostle, migrated permanently to New Zealand and he was the first Pastor officially called by founding members to lead the Samoan Assemblies of God churches in New Zealand.

The Samoan Assemblies of God in New Zealand and the Assemblies of God in New Zealand share the same faith and worked cooperatively since 1967. With the consent and assistance of the Assemblies of God in New Zealand, the Samoan Assemblies of God in New Zealand used some of the structures of the Assemblies of God in New Zealand, such as provision of pastors' credentials. Some of the local churches of the Samoan Assemblies of God paid tithes and made financial contributions to the Assemblies of God in New Zealand to assist with administration costs.

The Samoan Assemblies of God in New Zealand worked independently of, but cooperatively, with the Assemblies of God in New Zealand. The cooperative relationship of the two parallel fellowships led to a mistaken belief that the Samoan Assemblies of God in New Zealand were governed by the Constitution of the Assemblies of God in New Zealand.

The Samoan Assemblies of God in New Zealand are a group of individuals who are predominantly Samoans by birth or descent, in presently unincorporated local Churches, who share a common interest in Pentecostal Christianity and the fundamental philosophy of Assemblies of God movements worldwide as one of cooperative fellowship between local Churches.

By voluntary agreement, local churches of the Samoan Assemblies of God in New Zealand have collectively formed an umbrella national body known as the Samoan Assemblies of God in New Zealand Incorporated, for the benefit of all local churches.

== Beliefs ==
=== Fundamental doctrines ===
The central beliefs of the Samoan Assemblies of God are summarised in its Statement of Fundamental Truths. Numerous other Christian groups share some or all of these tenets, and some positions are considered more central to the faith than others. The following is a summary of these 16 non-negotiable Truths:

1. The Bible is inspired by God and is "the infallible, authoritative rule of faith and conduct".
2. There is only one true God who exists as a Trinity.
3. Jesus Christ is the Son of God and, as the second person of the Trinity, is God.
4. Man was created good by God but was separated from God through original sin.
5. Salvation "is received through repentance toward God and faith toward the Lord Jesus Christ". For more information, see the Core beliefs section below.
6. There are two ordinances. Believer's baptism by immersion is a declaration to the world of the believer's faith in Christ. The Lord's Supper is a symbolic remembrance of Christ's suffering and death.
7. Baptism in the Holy Spirit is a separate and subsequent experience following conversion. Spirit baptism brings empowerment to live an overcoming Christian life and to be an effective witness. For more information, see the Core beliefs section below.
8. Speaking in tongues is the initial physical evidence of the baptism in the Holy Spirit.
9. Sanctification is "an act of separation from that which is evil, and of dedication unto God". It occurs when the believer identifies with, and has faith in, Christ in his death and resurrection. It is not believed to be a "second definite work of grace" (see Finished Work), as in some other Pentecostal denominations, but is understood to be a process in that it requires continual yielding to the Holy Spirit.
10. The Church's mission is to seek and save all who are lost in sin; the Church is the Body of Christ and consists of all people who accept Christ, regardless of Christian denomination.
11. Divinely called and scripturally-ordained ministers serve the Church.
12. Divine healing of the sick is provided for in the atonement.
13. The "imminent and blessed hope" of the Church is its rapture preceding the bodily return of Christ to earth.
14. The rapture of the Church will be followed by the visible return of Christ and his reign on earth for a thousand years. For more information, see the Core beliefs section below.
15. There will be a final judgment and eternal damnation for the "wicked dead".
16. There will be future new heavens and a new earth "wherein dwelleth righteousness".

=== Core beliefs ===
The Samoan Assemblies of God considers salvation, baptism in the Holy Spirit with the evidence of speaking in tongues, divine healing and the Second Coming of Christ to be its four core beliefs.

==== Salvation ====
The Statement of Fundamental Truths states, "Man's only hope of redemption is through the shed blood of Jesus Christ the Son of God". The Assemblies of God holds the Arminian position on salvation; while it agrees with the Calvinist position that God is sovereign, at the same time, it believes that mankind has free will—free to accept or reject God's gift of salvation and eternal life. Therefore, the Assemblies of God disapproves of the doctrines of double predestination and the unconditional security of the believer which holds that once saved it is impossible for a person to be lost. Instead, the Assemblies of God believes that salvation is received and kept by faith, if faith in Christ is lost, then salvation is lost.

==== Baptism in the Holy Spirit ====
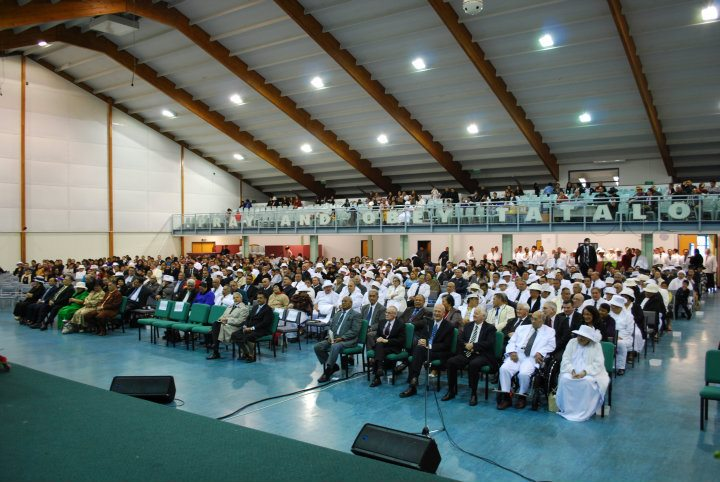
Service at the Samoan AOG church in Māngere, New Zealand

According to the Statement of Fundamental Truths, "All believers are entitled to and should ardently expect and earnestly seek" the baptism in the Spirit. It also states, "This was the normal experience of all in the early Christian Church". It is a separate experience from and occurs after salvation. This baptism gives to the receiver an "enduement of power for life and service, the bestowment of the gifts and their uses in the work of the ministry". There are four experiences listed in the Fundamental Truths that result from Spirit baptism: "overflowing fullness of the Spirit", "a deepened reverence for God", intensified consecration and dedication to God and his work, and "a more active love for Christ, for His Word and for the lost". The "initial physical sign" of having received this baptism is "speaking with other tongues as the Spirit of God gives them utterance". This experience initiates the believer in the use of spiritual gifts.

Baptism in the Holy Spirit with the evidence of speaking in tongues is not a requirement for membership or participation in an Assembly of God church. However, it is a requirement for ministerial licensing and ordination. The practical implication of this is that candidates for ministry who have not had this experience are not eligible for formal ministry. Given the congregational elements of AG polity, the culture of each Assembly of God church varies. In some churches, the practice of speaking in tongues is common while in others it rarely occurs.

An increasing minority of pastors has expressed concern that there is a lack of biblical support for the claim that Spirit baptism must always be accompanied with speaking in tongues. This concern corresponds with a decrease in the number of Assembly of God adherents reporting baptism in the Holy Spirit; according to the AG's Office of Statistics as of 2003 less than 50 percent of adherents had this experience. These challenges to the AG's traditional position were noted in a 2007 report by the AG's Spiritual Life Committee:

Yet, the distinctive doctrine that once united us has, in some circles, become a point of contention. We lament the increasing rarity of the gifts of the Spirit in our worship setting. We wonder where, in our busy church schedules, will people have an opportunity to tarry at the altars for a transforming Pentecostal experience?

Despite these challenges, the 53rd General Council in 2009 passed a resolution reaffirming the doctrine of initial physical evidence.

==== Divine healing ====
The Assemblies of God understands divine healing to have been provided for in the atonement. Looking to scripture, such as James 5 and Isaiah 53:5, the AG believes that Christians can pray for healing. Indeed, it believes scripture gives elders of the church the responsibility to pray "the prayer of faith" over the sick. It believes God can and does heal, but believes that God is sovereign and that, whether one is healed or not, a person's trust must be in God. It sees no conflict in trusting God for healing and receiving medical care. Healing testimonies regularly appear in the official publication, the Pentecostal Evangel, and prayer for healing and testimony commonly occur in church services.

While adamant that divine healing is a reality, the AG is not dogmatic on the subject of how one is healed. Margaret Poloma summarised this view stating, "Physical healing is not certain, automatic, or subject to formula. At the same time, it remains a tenet and practice of the Assemblies of God". It rejects the view that healing is caused or influenced by positive confession, as found in Word of Faith teachings; nevertheless, given the somewhat decentralised nature of the fellowship, these teachings have influenced some congregations.

==== Christ's Second Coming ====
The Statement of Fundamental Truths articles 13 and 14 articulate the Assemblies of God's official teaching on the return of Christ to Earth. It is a dispensationalist and premillennialist eschatology which includes the pre-Tribulation rapture of the Church—the "imminent and blessed hope". The rapture of the Church will be followed by Christ's visible return to earth and his reign of 1,000 years. This millennial reign will usher in the salvation of the nation of Israel and universal peace. The Assemblies of God is specifically opposed to the theologies and practices of universal salvation, setting dates for Christ's return, posttribulation rapture, and amillennialism.

=== Position statements ===
The Samoan Assemblies of God has released statements on various issues not addressed in the Statement of Fundamental Truths. These position papers are usually written by the Doctrinal Purity Commission, a standing committee of the General Council, which reviews and responds to issues referred to it by the Executive Presbytery. Position papers are not official positions of the Samoan Assemblies of God unless recommended by the Executive Presbytery and approved by the General Council. Position statements touch on biblical, theological, and social concerns.

- Abstinence from alcohol: On the consumption of alcohol, the Samoan Assemblies of God calls on its members and adherents to live life-styles of total abstinence (see Christianity and alcohol).
- Apostles and Prophets: The Samoan Assemblies of God does not recognise titles or offices of "apostle" and "prophet". It does, however, believe there are those in the church who "exercise the ministry function of apostles and prophets". Apostolic functions relate to evangelising previously unreached areas or people groups, while prophetic functions "occur when believers speak under the anointing of the Spirit to strengthen, encourage, or comfort". "Prophecy is a continuing gift of the Holy Spirit that is broadly distributed as the Spirit wills throughout Pentecostal churches". Predictive prophecy that proves false or prophecy which "departs from biblical truth" is false prophecy. The Samoan Assemblies of God believes in the four ministry gifts of apostles, prophets, evangelists, and pastor/teachers but notes that there are no biblical instructions for the appointment of apostles and prophets today.
- Assisted suicide and abortion: Viewing all human life as sacred, the Samoan Assemblies of God opposes assisted suicide and abortion (unless the life of the mother is endangered). It believes scripture is silent on the use of contraception and therefore takes no position on this subject (see Christian views on suicide, Christianity and abortion and Christian views on contraception).
- Creation: The Samoan Assemblies of God believes that the account of creation in the book of Genesis "accurately communicates God's creation of the heavens and the earth" and that "the New Testament treats the creation and fall of Adam and Eve as historical events". It acknowledges that Christians will have different views on "the age of the earth, the age of humankind, and the ways in which God went about the creative processes" but urges them to "avoid divisiveness over debatable theories of creation". It also affirms that "God reveals himself both in Scripture and the created order" (see Creationism).
- Demon Possession: The Samoan Assemblies of God believes it is possible for people to be demon possessed and to be delivered by the "power of the Spirit, and the name of Jesus". However, it cautions against overemphasis on demonology and rejects the belief that Christians can be possessed by evil spirits.
- Ministry to the disabled: The Samoan Assemblies of God teaches that people with disabilities are loved by God. They should be treated with dignity and fully included in the life of the Church.
- Divorce and remarriage: Officially, the Samoan Assemblies of God disapproves of Christians divorcing for any cause except "fornication and adultery". Where these circumstances exist or where a Christian has been divorced by an unbeliever (see Pauline privilege), the AG allows "the question of remarriage to be resolved by the believer in the Light of God's Word". For Christians who were divorced and remarried before their conversion, it is recommended that local AG churches receive them as members. The General Council has offered this guideline for AG churches; however, churches are free to determine their own standards of membership with the result that many local churches will admit divorced and remarried persons as members even if the above conditions are not met (see Christian views on divorce).

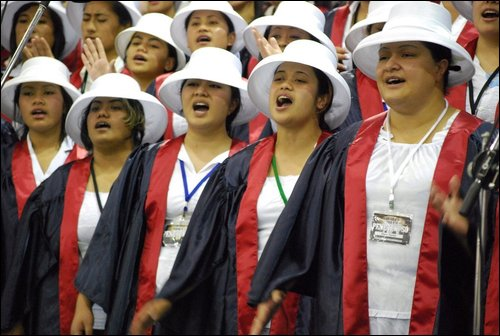
Women in the worship choir wearing hats

- Gambling: The Samoan Assemblies of God opposes gambling, believing that it is a disregard of responsible stewardship, involves a chance of gain at the expense and suffering of others, is inconsistent with the work ethic of scripture, and tends to be habit forming.
- Homosexuality: The fellowship takes the position that the biblical ideal of marriage is between one man and one woman and that the Bible condemns all sex outside of marriage, whether heterosexual or homosexual. Furthermore, it emphasises that "believers who struggle with homosexual temptations must be encouraged and strengthened by fellow Christians" and that believers "must hold no malice toward, or fear, of homosexuals" but "reach out in humility and compassion" (see Christianity and homosexuality).
- Positive Confession: While the Samoan Assemblies of God affirms that "All the blessings which God has for His people are received through faith" (including salvation, Spirit baptism, "divine preservation", "healing and provision of material needs", and the motivation to witness), it rejects the teaching that faith or "positive confession" "compels God's action". It holds that believers must consider the totality of scripture, consider adequately the will of God, recognise that they can expect suffering in life, and recognise the sovereignty of God. It also stresses the importance of persistent prayer, as opposed to simply confessing or "claiming" the promises of God.
- Women's role in ministry: The Samoan Assemblies of God affirms the ministry of women in the church and allows them to be ordained and serve in pastoral roles (see Ordination of women).
- Head Covering for Women: Women in ministry wear head coverings or hats to church. When serving in the worship team to preaching and prophesying, it is a requirement for women in ministry. Culturally, it is an act of reverence that Samoan women in general have towards God, therefore this is not only a requirement in this movement, but across every other Samoan church. For other women in the church, it is encouraged but not enforced. This aspect is a reflection of royalty in the movement, as the women in ministry recognize themselves to be Daughters of the King.

== Structure ==
The national movement as a corporate body is known as the Samoan Assemblies of God, locally the church is known as the Samoan Assembly of God.

The Samoan Assemblies of God in New Zealand are divided into 6 district councils, each council operates under a mother-church. The leader of each district is a representative in the executive presbytery, and are formally recognized as the Overseer. Each district operates autonomously, and gather once every three months to build strong relationships with other local branches which in turn is the equipping process of evangelism. The North Auckland Conference is currently led by Reverend Muavae Ta'ele Mika, there are over 30 churches under his direction, this regional fellowship includes West Auckland and Central, the mother-church is Auckland/Grey Lynn Samoan Assembly of God. The South Auckland Conference is led by Reverend Seleni Taoai, and currently has over 40 churches under his leadership, this regional fellowship includes East Auckland, the mother-church is Mangere Samoan Assembly of God. The North Central Conference, which is located in the upper north island and includes Waikato and Bay of Plenty Regions consists of 15 churches, the mother-church of this district is Tokoroa Samoan Assembly of God, but is led by Reverend Tapelu Aupa'au from Taupō. South Central Conference consists of 10 churches, this region includes Manawatū, Taranaki and Hawkes Bay Regions, the mother-church is officially recognized as the Napier Samoan Assembly of God, but is led by Reverend Levi Kereti from Hastings. Wellington Conference has over 30 churches, although the mother-church is officially Porirua Assembly of God and formerly Wellington Samoan Assembly of God, the head church of this region is located in Wanuiomata. South Island conference consists of the whole South Island, which has 20 churches, is led by Reverend Iosefa Taula.

The Samoan Assemblies of God in New Zealand gather annually at their national conventions which is formally referred to as the General Council of Churches, it is held in the three main New Zealand centres of Auckland, Wellington and Christchurch. These conferences only last 3 days and are always during the Easter Weekend break. Every two years, the fellowship have General Elections where registered delegates nominate and ordain the Eldership, who are formally recognized as the National Executive Council. Each local church is required to have 8 representatives present at every conference, that includes the Senior Pastor, First Lady, Assistant Pastor and Spouse, Secretary and Treasurer of the local church, Youth Pastor and Sunday School President, these are known as the Official Business Delegates, and have the right to address local matters and discuss church business with the Leadership board and have the power to vote. Dr Samani Pulepule has been nominated and ordained with a vote of 100% since 1968 (the first Samoan Assemblies General Council) right up until his retirement in 2011.

== Controversy ==
Samani Pulepule Convention Centre. Māngere, Auckland.

The church was undergoing court cases and was fighting for assets, mainly the Samani Pulepule Centre the Samoan Assemblies of God Headquarters in Māngere, Auckland which seats up to 4,000 and contains the National offices of the fellowship.

In 2005 when the Samoan Assemblies of God formed an incorporated society, AOGNZ suspended all pastors credentials and stripped their membership as a New Zealand Assemblies of God fellowship. That same year in December, the Samoan Assemblies of God had a special service at the Samani Pulepule Centre with World leaders of the Assemblies of God. All pastors that had suspended credentials as ministers of AOGNZ, and churches that had their memberships stripped from them, were again formally ordained as Assemblies of God members and ministers, an affiliated part of the Assemblies of God worldwide. 45 Pastors were ordained and 45 churches were officially registered as the Samoan Assemblies of God in New Zealand Incorporated.

In 2006 the church had a World Conference in Samoa, which saw New Zealand represented by both Samoan fellowships, this had shown the division amongst the New Zealand churches as both groups performed separate musicals. During the world leaders meeting, Pastor Ailaulau had walked into the conference room where the meeting was taking place, but was then told to leave. The other World leaders stated that there is only one Samoan fellowship in New Zealand, and that it was the fellowship directed by Pastor Samani Pulepule. This was also the conference where Pastor Samani Pulepule was ordained as the General Superintendent of the Samoan Assemblies International.

In 2007 a group of Samoan pastor's from AOGNZ had broken into the Samani Pulepule Centre and changed all the locks. Immediately the Samoan Executive Council was alerted, and arrived at the Convention Centre finding the group of pastor's with a court document saying they were permitted to do this, through Police investigation they found that the court document was signed by one of the pastor's themselves, and ordered the group of pastor's to immediately leave the premises, and if they were found on the property again, they would be arrested.

In 2009 Both parties of the Samoan Assemblies of God have come to an agreement and have stopped all court cases. See Samoan Assemblies of God Video

There are now 126 Samoan Assemblies of God churches in New Zealand under the leadership of the new Chief Apostle Reverend Tafuna'i To'oseu Muaiava. Since the split in 2005 the church continues to grow and has rekindled the relationship between the other Samoan fellowship, and they continue to work together.

== Past Church events ==
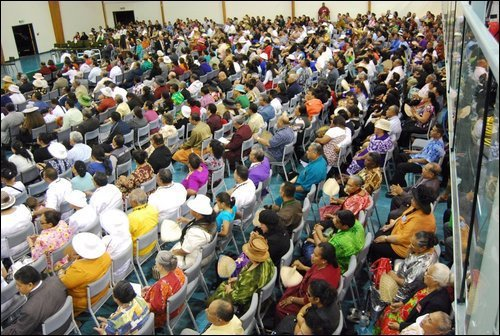
a Samoan Assemblies of God Megachurch in Māngere

Since the beginning of the Samoan Assemblies of God in New Zealand, they have hosted four past World Conferences. The first World Conference that New Zealand hosted was in 1982 known as the "Jesus the Saviour Conference" which was attended by over 1,000 members of the church, and also members of the Auckland City Council, the Manukau City Council, the then General Superintendent of the AOGNZ and World Leaders.

The 1992 conference was the beginning of a Revival never seen in New Zealand before amongst the Samoan people, the churches numbers had tripled since the last world conference in New Zealand, and the new Samoan Assemblies of God headquarters that seated up to 3,000 people was officially opened. This was the first time the Samoan Assemblies of God churches from Germany were in attendance.

In 2003 the Samani Pulepule Convention Centre was renovated and extended to seat over 4,000 people and in 2004 the number of churches in New Zealand had grown to 89 with a membership of 15,000. During the "Pray and Obey Conference" in 2004, there were over 15,000 people in attendance, with over 2,000 members from Samoa, 2,000 members from Australia and 800 members from Mainland USA, and larger proportion of members from American Samoa, Hawaii and Alaska. This conference also made national news headlines due to the traffic it had caused on the motorway as parked cars had reached the south-west motorway causing huge delays all week long.

By 2008, the churches in New Zealand had split, bringing the numbers of adherents from 16,000 to 9,000. New Zealand was asked to host the world convention during the World Leaders Meeting in Samoa 2007, Samoa had just hosted it the previous year, Australia and Mainland USA had no venues for such a Conference, and the Samoan AOG Convention Centre in American Samoa was too small. There were doubts on hosting the Conference in New Zealand, because the Samani Pulepule Centre was then undergoing court cases, and the fear of losing the Centre when it came to the time of the Conference had people doubting whether New Zealand was able to host the Conference, however the "Revive the Spirit of Pentecost – Toe Fa'aolaola le Agaga o le Penetekoso Conference" went ahead in December 2008 and New Zealand had hosted the 16th World Conference.

There have been numerous events the church has, such as the Katinas Concert (who are members of the Samoan Assemblies of God in Mainland USA). Also numerous Youth Rallies the Church hosts, and other community events.

Youth Conferences have been held at Auckland Samoan Assembly of God (formerly Grey Lynn Samoan Assembly of God) which is a church that seats 1,200 people. Also, Otara Samoan Assembly of God has hosted these Youth Conferences.

During Queens Birthday Weekend, each region has their own conference like events, which includes the National Bible Exam. Those that qualify for the National prizegiving receive honorary gifts at the National Conference. At the end of each month, each district council gather together for a combined service.

== The Executive Council ==
The Executive Council is made up of ordained Pastors who have served for more than two years at their local church. Elections are held biannually at the National Conference which is always held during the Easter break at the Samani Pulepule Centre, the church's headquarters.

Name	Role	Church	Notes
Rev. Tafuna'i Muaiava	Chief Apostle and General Superintendent	Mt Roskill Samoan Assembly of God	promoted to Head Office during the 2016 Business Conference.
Rev. Motu Mati'a	Assistant Superintendent	Māngere Samoan Assembly of God	former General Superintendent
Rev. Lamositele Na'amanu	National Secretary General	New Lynn Samoan Assembly of God	elected in 2012 during the resignation of former Secretary, Rev Penani Si'ulepa.
Rev. Taula Young	National Treasurer	Hamilton Samoan Assembly of God	served as the Treasurer for over 20 years
Rev. Lala Tavesi	National Sunday School president	Te Atatū Samoan Assembly of God	elected during the 2016 Business Conference.
Rev. Fa'amanū Lalotoa-Peniata	Youth Department president	Glen Eden Samoan Assembly of God	elected during the 2016 Business Conference.
Rev. Fasio Afoa	Presbyter-elect of the South Auckland Conference	Avondale Samoan Assembly of God	promoted in 2019 following the demise of Rev. Seleni Taoai.
Rev. Muavae Ta'ele Mika	Presbyter of the North Auckland Conference	North Shore Samoan Assembly of God	elected during the 2016 Business Conference.
Rev. Tapelu Aupa'au	Presbyter for the North Central Conference	Taupō Samoan/Tokelauan Assembly of God	elected in 2008 following the newly established conference, a new seat in the Executive Council.
Rev. Lauafia Taula	Presbyter for South Central Conference	New Plymouth Samoan Assembly of God	elected in 2018 following the resignation of Rev. Levi Kereti
Rev. Foua Taloaina	Presbyter for the Wellington Conference	Silverstream Samoan Assembly of God	elected in 2008 following the demise of former Presbyter, Rev. Ioelu Mainu'u.
Rev. Uaale Elisara	Presbyter for the South Island Conference	Dunedin Samoan Assembly of God	elected in 2018 following the resignation of Rev. Iosefa Taula.

== People from the Samoan AOG in New Zealand ==
- Ali Lauitiiti
- Rev. Iliafi Esera
- Jerome Kaino
- J. Williams
- Kahn Fotuali'i
- Liam Messam
- Matt Utai
- Maalili Muliaina
- Roger Tuivasa-Sheck

== Pentecostal denominations birthed from the Samoan Assemblies of God ==
- Assembly of God Church of Samoa
- Alofa Tunoa Pentecostal Ministries
- Bible Study Samoan Church
- First Samoan Assembly of Christ
- New Assembly of God
- Good Samaritan Church of Jesus Christ
- Kingdom of God Church of Samoa
- Peace Chapel
- Pentecostal Church of Samoa
- Siitia Keriso Church of God
- Samoa Mercy Ministries International
- Samoan Independent Assembly of God
- Samoa Worship Centre
- Samoa Redeemer Revival Christian Centre
- Church of God Samoa
- Agape International Ministries (AIMS) Church Samoa International
- Church of God Samoa
- Emmanuel Church Samoa
- Samoa Full Gospel Church
- Voice of Christ Ministries Church Samoa.
- Devine Ministries Australia
