= Solosolo =

- Village
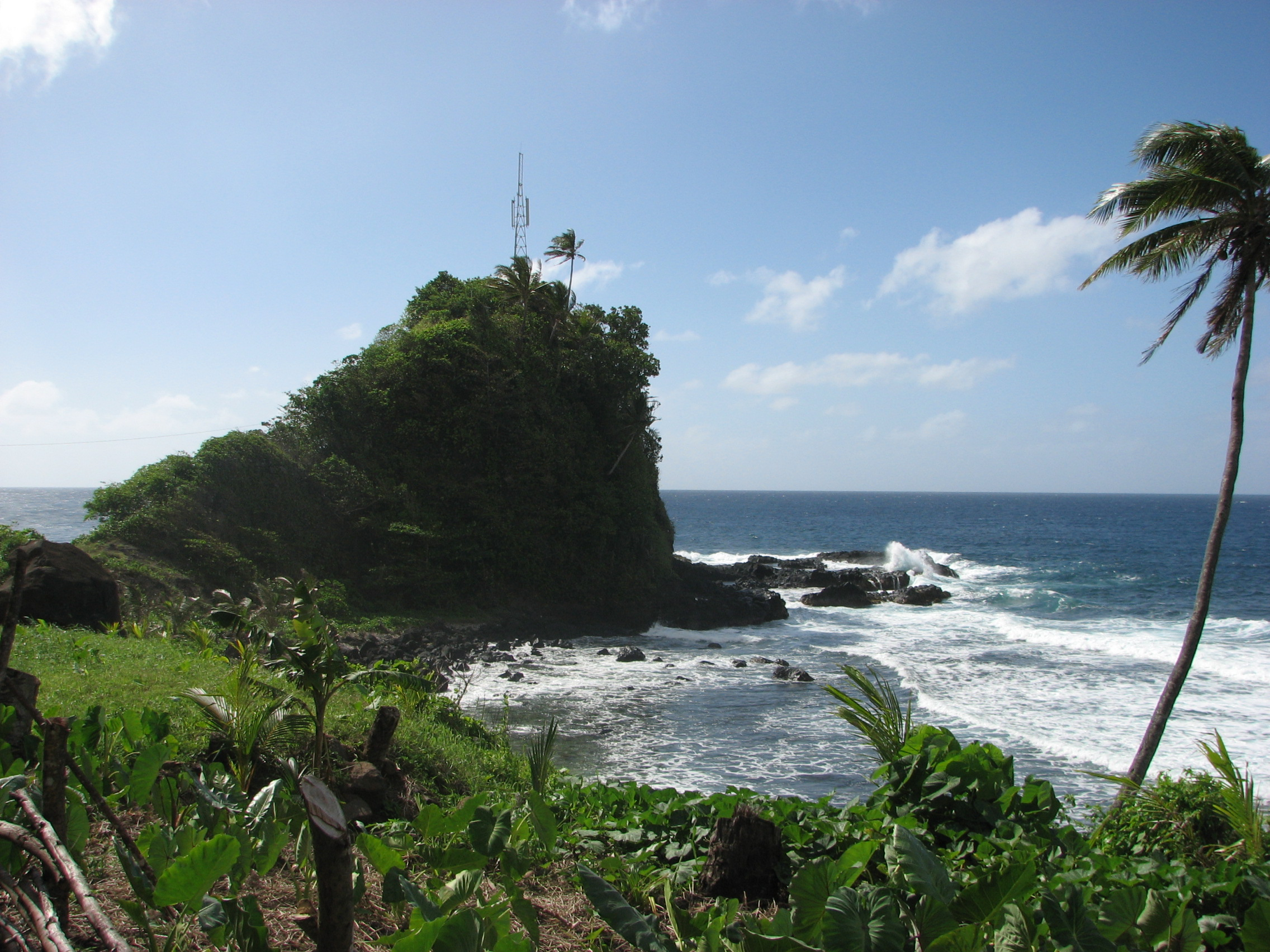
- Local surfing spot, nicknamed Plum Pudding Rock, by Solosolo.

- Location within Samoa
- Coordinates: 13°52′26″S 171°38′26″W
- Country: Samoa
- District: Atua

Population (2016)
  - Total: 1,851
- Time zone: -11

Solosolo is a village on the northeast coast of Upolu island in Samoa. The village is in the political district of Atua and had a population of 1,851 in the 2016 census and 1,835 in the 2021 census. It is one of the prominent settlements in the area with the largest population in its electoral constituency of Anoama'a 2 (formerly Anoama’a West).

== Geography ==
The villagers live on a small peninsula jutting out into the sea and bounded by Vainamo bay in the west and Mulivai River to the east. Settlement has grown well into the plantation hinterland in the hills above Vainamo and reaches at least 200m inland. The upland and lowland portions of the village are separated by the main east coast road connecting Solosolo to Apia, the country's capital, (30 minutes west) and eastern Upolu.

== Governance ==
At the cross-roads of the village between the upland and peninsula, sits the village council maota fono. It is here that the chiefs of all the families of the village meet regularly to deliberate on the political, social, and economic affairs of the village. It is guided by the faalupega (customary greetings/genealogy) of Solosolo, which acts as a constitution for governance.

Faalupega o Solosolo Afio le paia o le Taofia o Malietoa Taulapapa ma le latou tama, Tupo-le-Sava, Afio le paia o le Usoalii taua ma e na 'au i Ao, ae mamalu ia te oe Saleutogipo'e, o le lima matua o Faleupolu e fa tofiga.

The highest-ranking chiefs are the group known as the Taofia of Malietoa Taulapapa (Leota Leuluaialii; Leota Seiuli; Leota Toomata) ma le latou tama (Pulepule). These are the paramount chiefs of the village and carry the most influence.

The second highest rank of chiefs are the group known as the “Usoalii” (brotherhood of chiefs). The Usoalii are the formal heads of the majority of all the families who have land rights in the village.

The third ranking group is a group of talking chiefs known as “Saleutogi”. While the Taofia and Usoalii speak on certain high-level occasions, Saleutogi are assigned most of the oratory duties in the village.

The three different groups govern the village in an intricate system of checks and balances based on traditional roles ordained by village history. The number of Taofia are limited to four (as of 2023). The Usoalii number several dozen and Saleutogi number in the hundreds (but mostly based overseas so in reality only several dozen play influential roles in village governance).

== Village ==
The village is split into various pitonuu (sub-villages) but ruled by one village council. They are Mulivai, Gataiala, Siumo’o, Vaioa, Solosolo Uta, Siupapa, and Namo.

The malae (village commons) of Solosolo is Siumo’o ma Vaioa. The malaefono (village council) is in Siumo’o ma Vaioa but the physical malae is in Gataiala (the area of the village situated on the peninsula from Mulivai (eastern end at the river mouth) to Namo (the Namo Bay Area). This is where the major ceremonies and sporting events take place, and like any Samoan village is the centre of the settlement. The malae is bordered to the west by a Congregational Christian Church and to the east by a Catholic church. These were the two original churches built in the village. In recent times, the village has acquired other Christian denominations including Methodist, Nazarene, Assembly of God, and Latter Day Saints. In 2016 it acquired a Seventh-Day Adventist church.

The local primary school sits on the first upland section of Solosolo (Siumo’o) and can be accessed by an inland sealed road (Solosolo Uta Street). New settlements and the plantations of Solosolo are situated further back along Solosolo Uta Street in Solosolo Uta.

== Environment ==
Given its susceptibility to past cyclones and the mountainous terrain of the area, Solosolo's infrastructure is particularly sensitive to natural disaster. The government constructed a seawall in 2006 to ring the Vainamo bay to protect the main east coast road and the bridge over the Namo river to the west of the bay, from wave damage during cyclones. By 2019 the seawall was deteriorating due to erosion.

In 2016 concerns over sea-level rise, erosion and flooding led to 60 percent of the village moving inland.

== Surfing ==
The bay is still renowned for surfing and is popular with visitors and local surfers, although the reef breaks are not for the inexperienced. There's a right break by a small rocky outcrop nicknamed 'Plum Pudding Rock.'
