= 2009 in New Zealand =

- Decades: 1980s; 1990s; 2000s; 2010s; 2020s
- See also: History of New Zealand; List of years in New Zealand; Timeline of New Zealand history

The following lists events that happened during 2009 in New Zealand.

== Population ==
- Estimated population as of 31 December: 4,332,100
- Increase since 31 December 2008: 51,900 (1.21%)
- Males per 100 Females: 95.8

== Incumbents ==
=== Regal and vice-regal ===
- Head of State – Elizabeth II
- Governor-General – Anand Satyanand
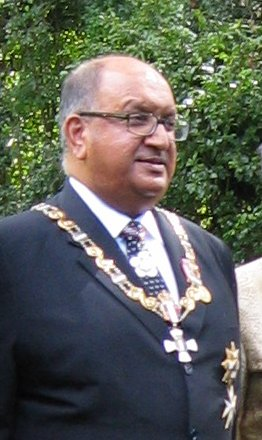
Anand Satyanand

=== Government ===
2009 was the first full year of the election of the 49th New Zealand Parliament.

- Speaker of the House – Lockwood Smith
- Prime Minister – John Key
- Deputy Prime Minister – Bill English
- Minister of Finance – Bill English
- Minister of Foreign Affairs – Murray McCully
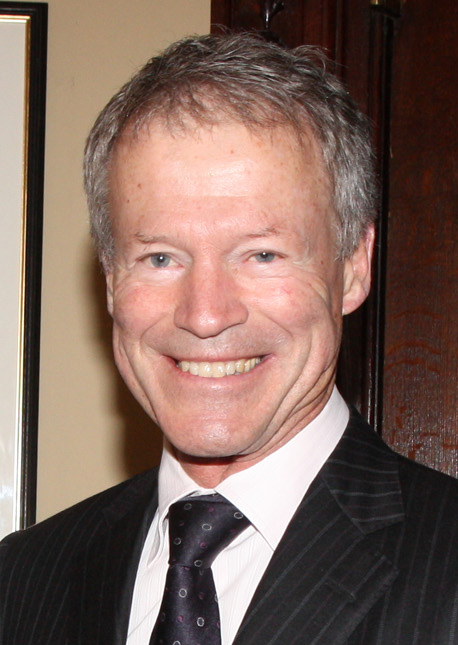
Lockwood Smith

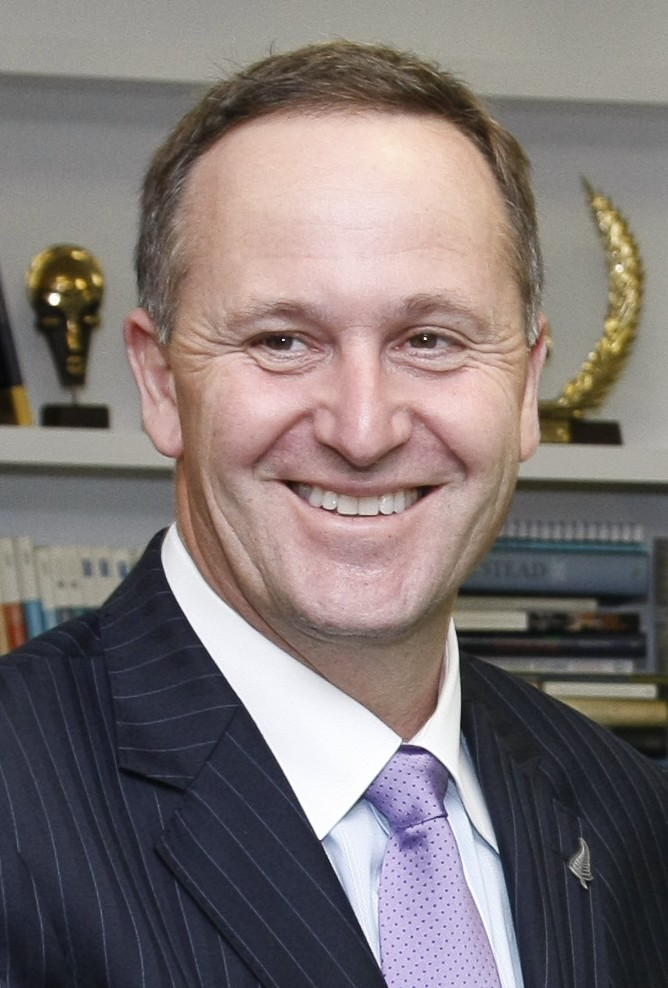
John Key

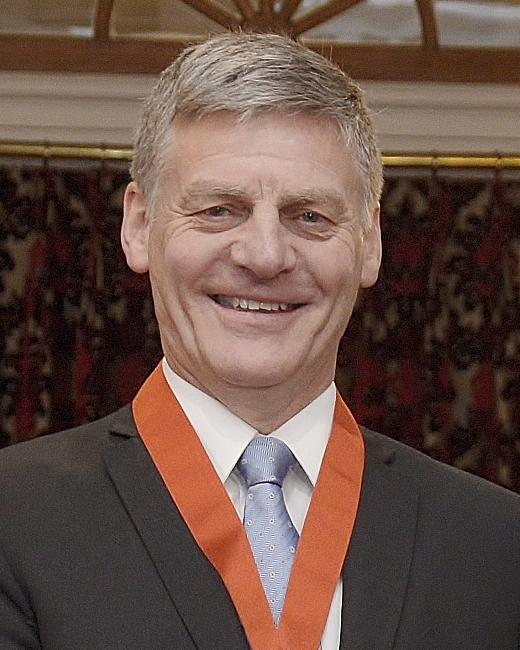
Bill English

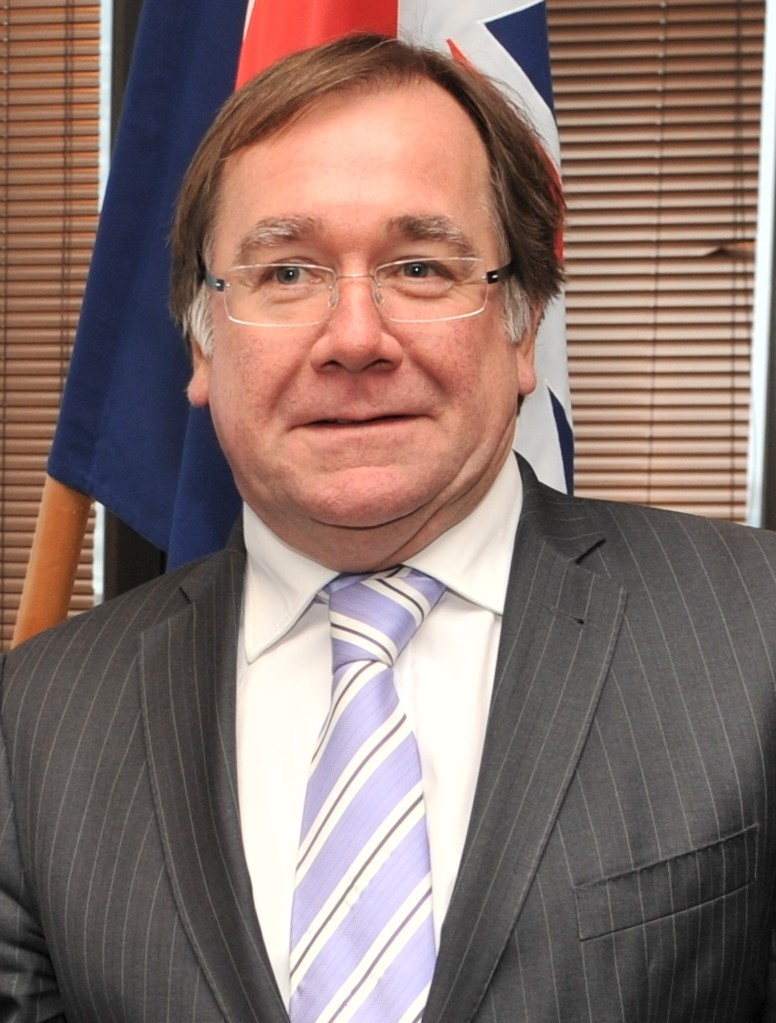
Murray McCully

=== Other party leaders ===
- Labour – Phil Goff (Leader of the Opposition since 11 November 2008)
- Act – Rodney Hide, since 13 June 2004
- Greens – Metiria Turei (since 30 May 2009) and Russel Norman (since 3 June 2006)
- Māori Party – Tariana Turia and Pita Sharples, both since 7 July 2004
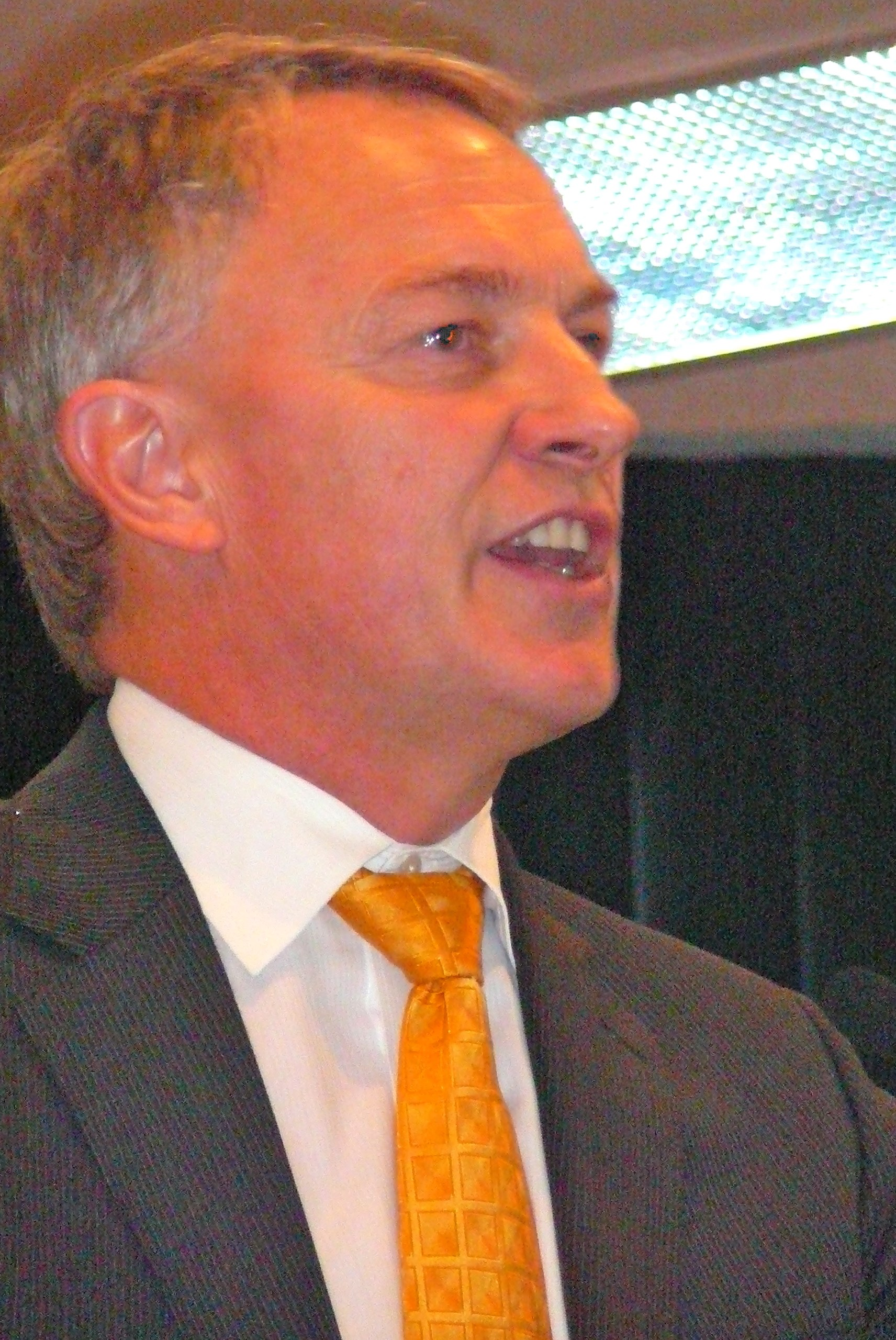
Phil Goff

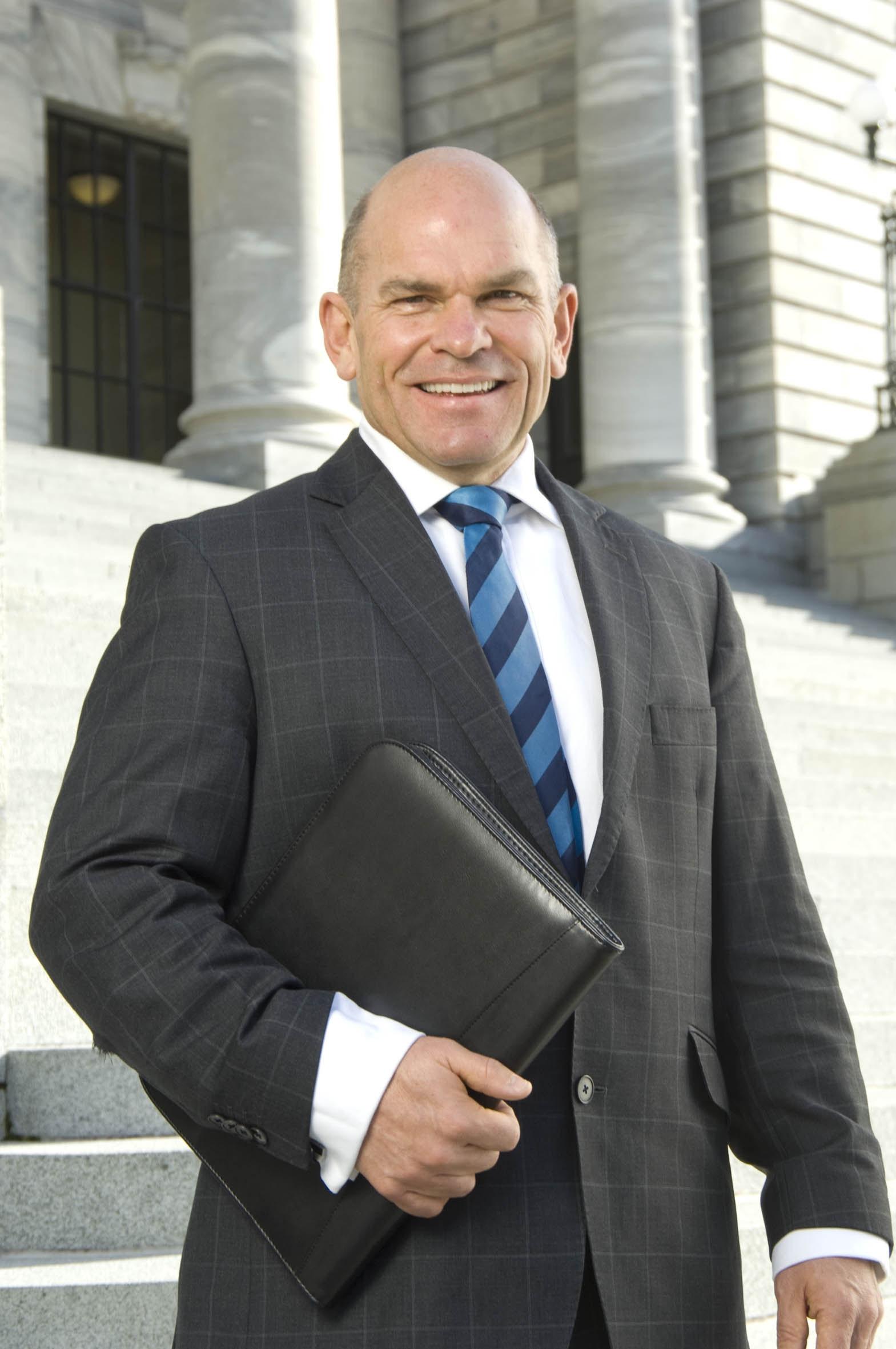
Rodney Hide

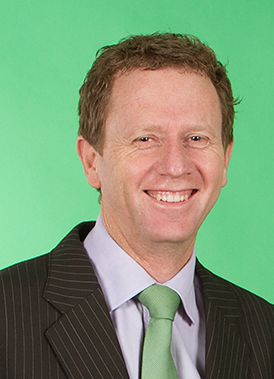
Russel Norman

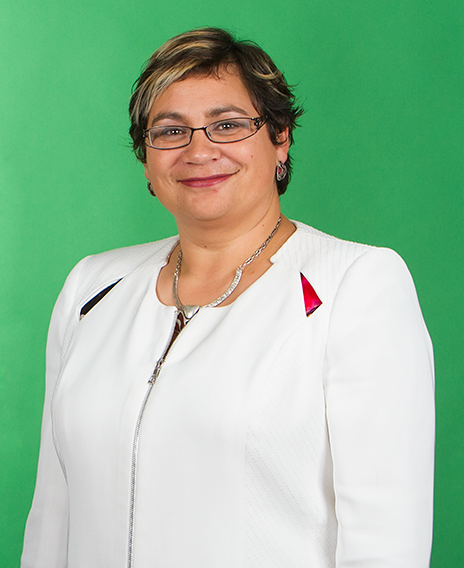
Metiria Turei

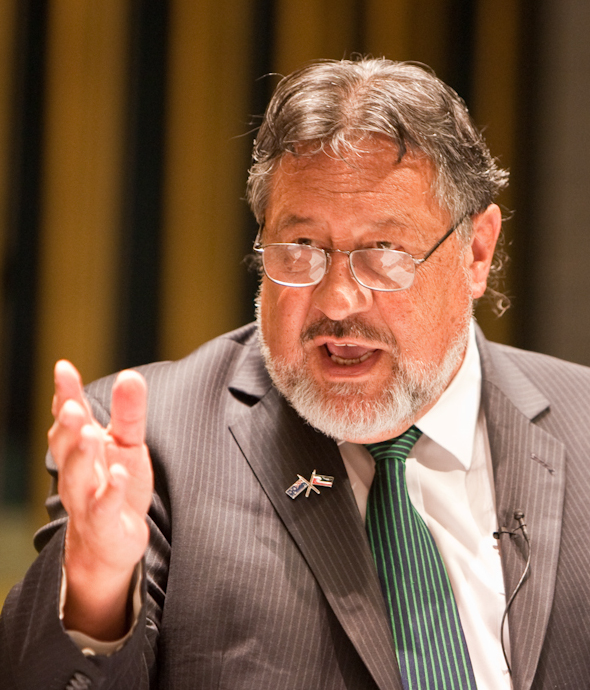
Pita Sharples

=== Judiciary ===
- Chief Justice — Sian Elias
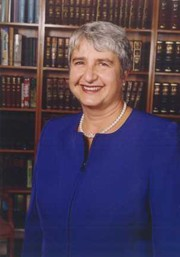
Dame Sian Elias

=== Main centre leaders ===
- Mayor of Auckland – John Banks, since October 2007
- Mayor of Tauranga – Stuart Crosby, since October 2004
- Mayor of Hamilton – Bob Simcock, since May 2007
- Mayor of Wellington – Kerry Prendergast, since October 2001
- Mayor of Christchurch – Bob Parker, since October 2007
- Mayor of Dunedin – Peter Chin, since October 2004
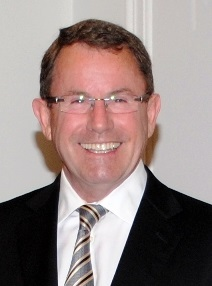
John Banks

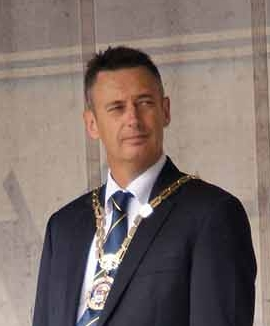
Stuart Crosby

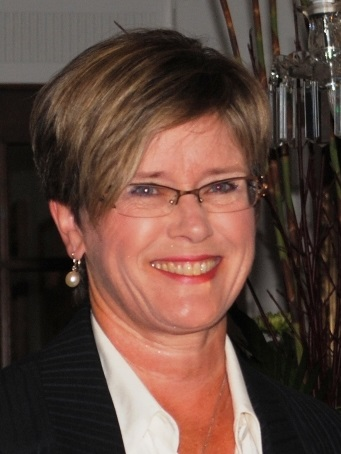
Kerry Prendergast

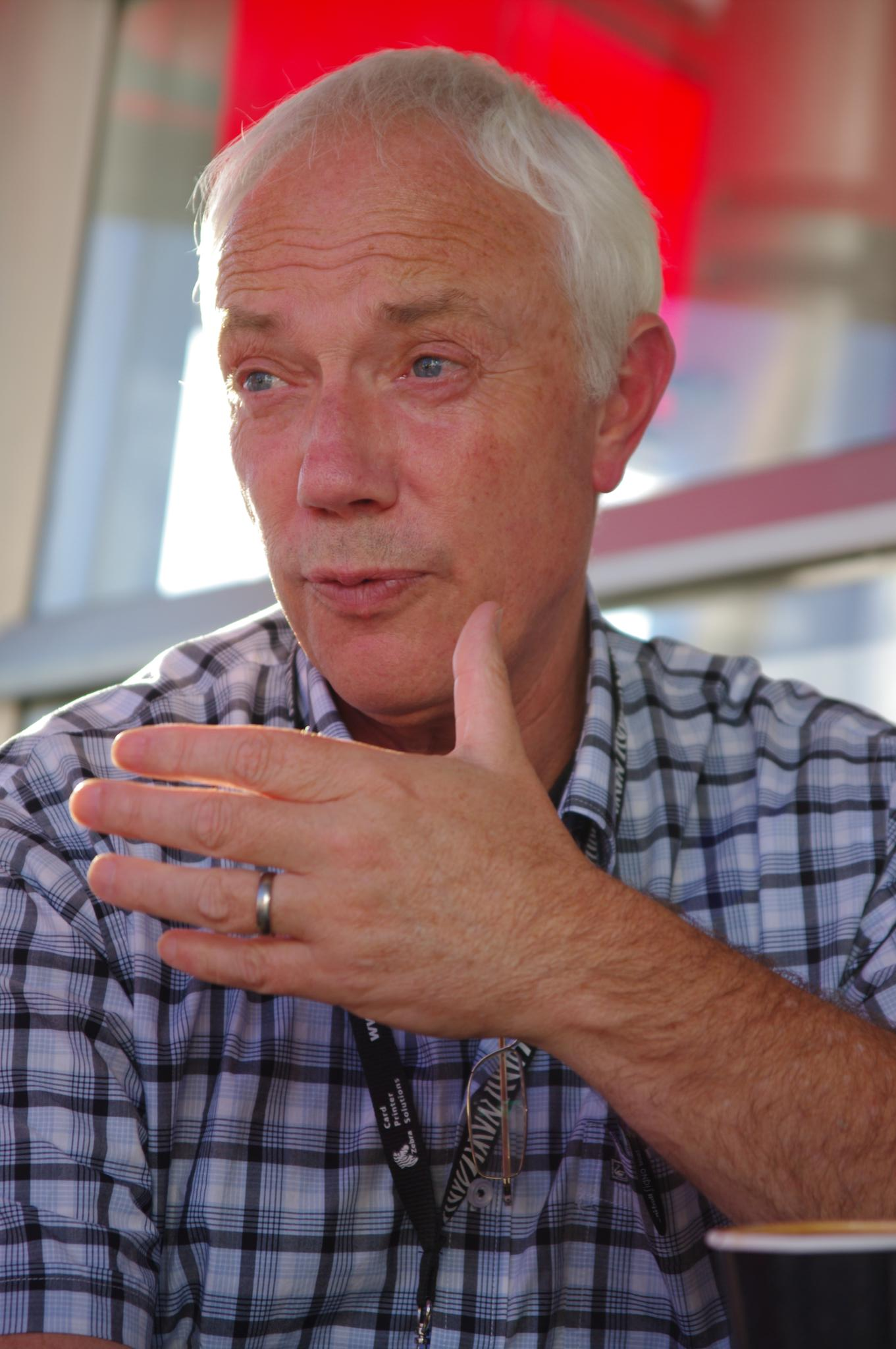
Bob Parker

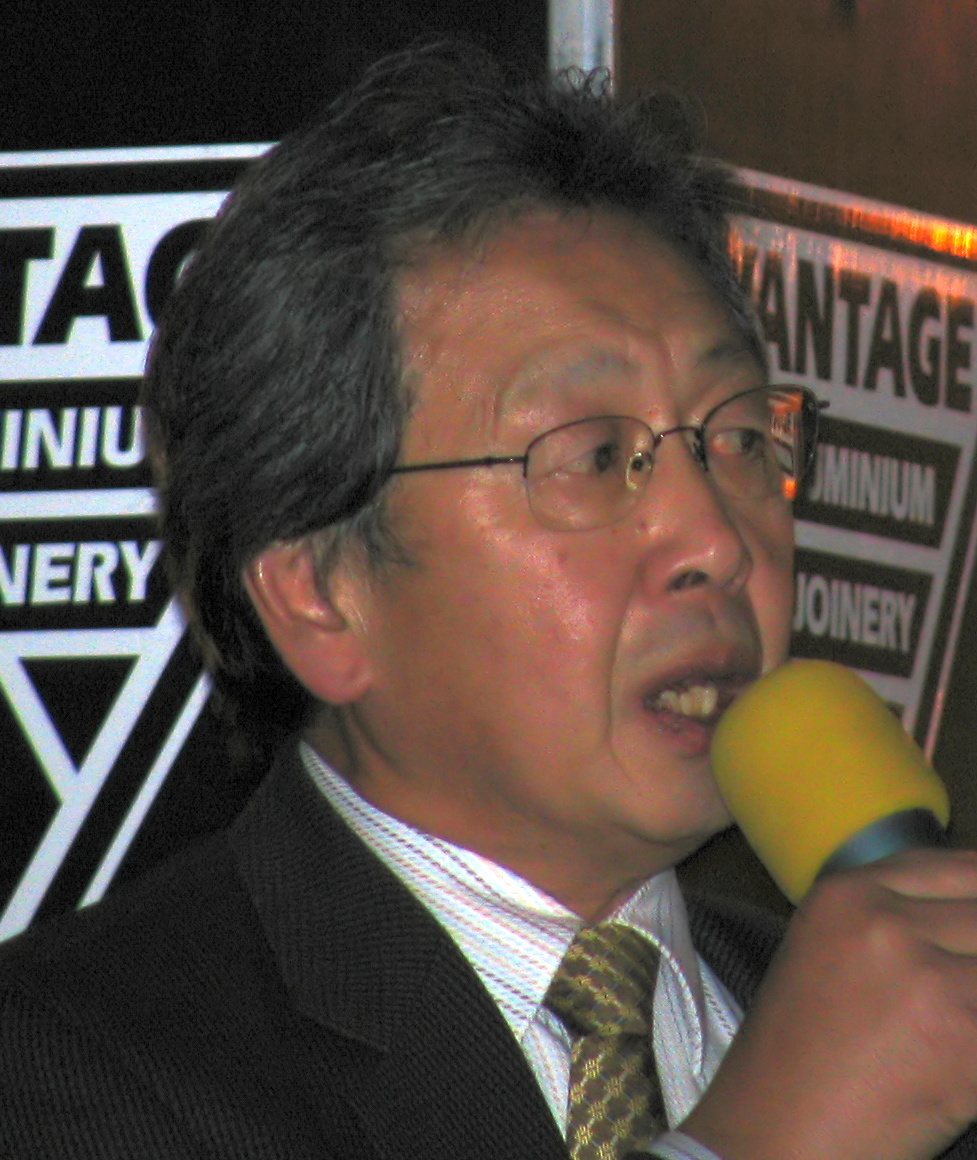
Peter Chin

== Events ==
=== February ===
- 27 February: Prime Minister John Key proposes a nine-day working fortnight, to counter the Late-2000s recession.

=== March ===
- 6 March: Retrial of David Bain begins in the Christchurch High Court
- 20 March: Roads of National Significance announced
- 25 March: Former Prime Minister Helen Clark is appointed Head of the United Nations Development Program; her resignation necessitates the 2009 Mount Albert by-election
- 26 March: the Royal Commission on Auckland Governance recommends eight Auckland Region local government bodies merge to form a "supercity".

=== April ===
- 25 April: First indication of potential for Flu infection with return of students from Mexico, see 2009 flu pandemic in New Zealand

=== May ===
- 7 May: Gunman Jan Molenaar shoots three police officers executing a routine cannabis search warrant, as well as a neighbour who tried to assist them. He killed Senior Constable Leonard Snee and seriously injured the others, and after a two-day siege, he was found dead.

=== June ===
- 3 June: A police investigation leads to MP Richard Worth resigning ministerial portfolios including Minister of Internal Affairs "for personal reasons", with Prime Minister John Key saying, "If he hadn't resigned I would have sacked him".
- 5 June: David Bain is found not guilty of the murder of five family members.
- 12 June: Five members of the family of Janet Moses were found guilty of manslaughter after performing a fatal exorcism.
- 24 June: A NZ$36.1 million first division jackpot in the New Zealand Lotteries Commission's Big Wednesday game is won by a Masterton-based lottery syndicate of four: the largest single lottery prize won in New Zealand.
- 29 June: A state of emergency is declared in the Waikato due to landslides.

=== July ===
- 4 July: The Ministry of Health confirms the first three deaths in New Zealand from the 2009 flu pandemic.
- 15 July: A magnitude 7.8 earthquake strikes in Fiordland at 9:22 pm, 90 km north-west of Tuatapere.

=== August ===
- 4 August: Former MP Phillip Field found guilty on bribery, corruption and obstruction of justice charges.
- 8–9 August: New Zealand's first Telethon for 16 years raises $2 million for the KidsCan Stand Tall Trust.

=== October ===
- 30 October – Electricity supply to Northland and northern Auckland is cut for three hours, affecting 280,000 customers, after a forklift carrying a shipping container hits the only major transmission line supplying the region.

=== November ===
- 30 November: Atea-1, the first New Zealand rocket into space, is launched from Great Mercury Island.

=== Full date unknown ===
- Liz Duggan begins serving as Archdeacon of Central Otago.

== Holidays and observances ==
- 6 February - Waitangi Day (Friday)
- 10 April/13 April Good Friday/Easter Monday
- 25 April - ANZAC Day (Saturday)
- 1 June - Queen's Birthday Monday
- 24 June - Matariki (Wednesday)
- 26 October - Labour Day Monday

== Arts and literature ==
=== Music ===
- May - New Zealand Music Month
  - Vodafone Album of the year: Ladyhawke - Ladyhawke
  - Vodafone Single of the year: Ladyhawke - My Delerium
  - Best group: Midnight Youth
  - Best male solo artist: Savage
  - Best female solo artist: Ladyhawke
  - Breakthrough artist of the year: Ladyhawke
  - Best Music Video: Chris Graham – Brother (Smashproof)
  - Best Rock Album: Midnight Youth – "The Brave Don't Run"
  - Best Urban/Hip Hop Album: Ladi 6 – "Time Is Not Much"
  - Best Aotearoa Roots Album: Fat Freddy's Drop – "Dr Boondigga and the Big BW"
  - Best dance/electronica album: Ladyhawke - Ladyhawke
  - Best gospel/Christian album: Mumsdollar - Ruins
  - Best classical album: David Bremner – "Gung Ho"
  - The Vodafone People's Choice Award, voted by New Zealand music fans: Smashproof
  - Highest Selling NZ Single: Smashproof feat. Gin - Brother
  - Highest Selling NZ Album: The Feelers - The Best: 1998 - 2008
  - Radio Airplay Record of the Year: Tiki Taane- "Always on my mind"

=== Performing arts ===
- Benny Award presented by the Variety Artists Club of New Zealand to Eddie Low MNZM.

=== Film ===
- Earth Whisperers/Papatuanuku

== Sport ==
=== Horse racing ===
==== Harness racing ====
- Auckland Trotting Cup: Auckland Reactor

==== Thoroughbred racing ====
- Katie Lee becomes the first racehorse to win both the New Zealand 2000 Guineas and the New Zealand 1000 Guineas.

=== Soccer ===
The 2009 Chatham Cup is won by Wellington Olympic, who beat Three Kings United 2–1 in the final.

=== Shooting ===
- Ballinger Belt –
  - David Rich (Australia)
  - Mike Collings (Te Puke), second, top New Zealander

== Births ==
- 27 August – Sacred Falls, Thoroughbred racehorse
- 4 September – Habibi, Thoroughbred racehorse
- 18 November – Dundeel, Thoroughbred racehorse
- 20 November – Prince of Penzance, Thoroughbred racehorse

== Deaths ==
=== January ===
- 4 January – Sonny Fai, rugby league player (born 1988)
- 8 January – Wally Williams, water polo player (born 1921)
- 17 January – Mike Parkinson, rugby union player (born 1948)
- 20 January – Lyn Forster, arachnologist (born 1925)
- 26 January – Gerry Merito, entertainer (born 1938)
- 26 January – Don Ladner, rugby league player (born c.1948)

=== February ===
- 4 February – Antonie Dixon, convicted murderer (born 1968)
- 27 February – Kilmeny Niland, artist and illustrator (born 1950)

=== March ===
- 2 March – Robert Bruce, professional wrestler and talent agent (born 1943)
- 9 March – Graham Mexted, rugby union player (born 1927)
- 10 March – Dell Bandeen, netball player (born 1922)
- 12 March – Mary Batchelor, politician (born 1927)
- 13 March – Geoff Moon, veterinary surgeon, ornithologist and photographer (born 1915)
- 21 March – Beach Towel, standardbred racehorse (foaled 1987)
- 24 March – Denis Miller, air force bomber and airline pilot (born 1918)

=== April ===
- 1 April – Kevin Briscoe, rugby union player (born 1936)
- 11 April – James Brodie, geologist, oceanographer and amateur historian and philatelist (born 1920)
- 17 April – Richard Sutton, chess player and legal academic (born 1938)
- 26 April – Sir Pupuke Robati, Cook Islands politician (born 1925)
- 27 April – John Bollard, lawyer, environment court judge (born 1940)

=== May ===
- 1 May – Sunline, thoroughbred racehorse (foaled 1995)
- 3 May – Percy Marunui Murphy, soldier and politician, first Māori mayor (born 1924)
- 12 May – Dame Heather Begg, opera singer (born 1932)
- 23 May
  - Jack McNab, rugby union player, coach and administrator (born 1924)
  - Sir Tangaroa Tangaroa, Cook Islands politician (born 1921)
- 30 May – Ferris de Joux, automotive design, engineer and constructor (born 1935)

=== June ===
- 7 June – Keith Steele, cricketer and lawyer (born 1951)
- 8 June – Taini Morrison, kapa haka leader (born c.1958)
- 12 June – Ivan Lichter, thoracic surgeon and palliative care pioneer (born 1918)
- 19 June – Ron Crocombe, Pacific studies academic (born 1929)
- 28 June – Tom Paulay, earthquake engineer (born 1923)
- 30 June – Joan Wiffen, amateur paleontologist (born 1922)

=== July ===
- 3 July – Frank Devine, newspaper editor and journalist (born 1931)
- 7 July – Ian Grey, rugby league player (born 1931)
- 11 July –
  - Seddon Bennington, museum administrator (born 1947)
  - Cyril Paskell, rugby league player (born 1927)
- 14 July – Bill Young, politician and diplomat (born 1913)
- 18 July – Graham Stanton, New Testament scholar (born 1940)
- 19 July – Ces Mountford, rugby league player and coach (born 1919)
- 20 July
  - Tom Hellaby, cricketer (born 1958)
  - Hew McLeod, historian (born 1932)
- 25 July – Lorrie Pickering, politician (born 1919)
- 30 July –
  - Julian Dashper, artist (born 1960)
  - Diggeress Te Kanawa, tohunga raranga (born 1920)

=== August ===
- 7 August
  - Jack Laird, potter (born 1920)
  - Eru Potaka-Dewes, actor, Māori religious leader and activist (born 1939)
- 11 August– Dorothy Potter, ophthalmic surgeon (born 1922)
- 16 August – Alistair Campbell, poet, playwright and novelist (born 1925)
- 18 August – Rufus Rogers, politician (born 1913)
- 21 August – Reg King, association football player (born 1927)
- 24 August – Kashin, elephant (born 1968)
- 26 August – Sir Jack Harris, 2nd Baronet, businessman (born 1906)
- 29 August – Bob Parker, rower (born 1934)
- 30 August – Percy Tetzlaff, rugby union player (born 1920)

=== September ===
- 8 September – Ahmed Said Musa Patel, Muslim religious leader (born 1937)
- 9 September – Dame Patricia Bergquist, zoology and anatomy academic (born 1933)
- 11 September – John Pattison, pilot, Battle of Britain veteran (born 1917)
- 12 September – Helen Wily, mathematician (born 1921)
- 20 September – Ken Hough, dual international cricketer and association footballer (born 1928)
- 24 September – Sir Howard Morrison, entertainer (born 1935)
- 26 September – Paul Medhurst, track cyclist (born 1953)
- 27 September – Murray Smith, politician (born 1941)

=== October ===
- 3 October – Leigh Davis, writer (born 1955)
- 4 October – Roger Green, archaeologist (born 1932)
- 9 October – Noel Bowden, rugby union player (born 1926)
- 13 October – Betty Clegg, watercolour artist (born 1926)
- 14 October – Martyn Sanderson, actor, filmmaker and poet (born 1938)
- 17 October – Dame Doreen Blumhardt, potter, ceramicist and arts educator (born 1914)
- 31 October – Tim Bickerstaff, broadcaster, newspaper columnist and author (born 1942)

=== November ===
- 4 November – Sir Don Beaven, diabetes researcher (born 1924)
- 5 November – Adam Firestorm, professional wrestler (born 1976)
- 15 November – Tia Barrett, diplomat (born 1947)
- 19 November – Pat Mackie, miner and trade unionist (born 1914)
- 29 November – Bill Hunt, alpine skier (born 1929)
- 30 November – Elva Simpson, netball player (born 1936)

=== December ===
- 3 December – Brian Mason, geochemist and mineralogist (born 1917)
- 6 December – Eldred Stebbing, record label founder and owner (born 1921)
- 8 December – Bub Bridger, poet and short-story writer (born 1924)
- 20 December – John Veitch, cricketer (born 1937)
- 29 December – Paul Sapsford, rugby union player (born 1949)
- 30 December – Jacqueline Sturm, poet and short-story writer (born 1927)

== See also ==
- List of years in New Zealand
- Timeline of New Zealand history
- History of New Zealand
- Military history of New Zealand
- Timeline of the New Zealand environment
- Timeline of New Zealand's links with Antarctica
