= 2004 New Year Honours (New Zealand) =

Annual awards for New Zealanders

- Previous: 2003 Queen's Birthday Honours; Next: 2004 Queen's Birthday Honours
- Type: New Zealand royal honours: New Zealand Order of Merit; Queen's Service Order; Queen's Service Medal
- Date: 31 December 2003
- Country: New Zealand

Highlights
- Total recipients: 189

The 2004 New Year Honours in New Zealand were appointments by Elizabeth II in her right as Queen of New Zealand, on the advice of the New Zealand government, to various orders and honours to reward and highlight good works by New Zealanders, and to celebrate the passing of 2003 and the beginning of 2004. They were announced on 31 December 2003.

The recipients of honours are listed here as they were styled before their new honour.

== New Zealand Order of Merit ==
=== Distinguished Companion (DCNZM) ===
- Leonard Ramsay Castle CBE – of Warkworth. For services to pottery.
- Anne Anituatua Delamere QSO – of Wellington. For services to Māori.
- John Packard Goulter JP – of Paihia, Bay of Islands. For services to business and the community.
- Judge Patrick Desmond Mahony – of Wellington. For services to the Family Court.
- Deirdre Glenna Milne QSO – of Auckland. For services to women and the community.
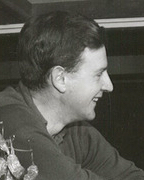
Len Castle

=== Companion (CNZM) ===
- John Barton Ormond Acland JP – of Geraldine. For services to farming and the community.
- Ronald Burgess – of Wellington. For services to the trade union movement.
- Francis Neil Dawson – of Christchurch. For services to sculpture.
- Professor Emeritus David Andross Farquhar – of Wellington. For services to music.
- Christine Mary Grice – of Hamilton. For services to the legal profession.
- Warren Arthur Larsen – of Wellington. For services to business.
- Dr Judith Helen McGregor – of Wellington. For services to journalism.
- Rear Admiral Peter Molesworth McHaffie OBE – Chief of Navy, Royal New Zealand Navy.
- Basil James Morrison JP – of Paeroa. For services to local government.
- Sister Sheila Mary O'Toole (Sister Laurence O'Toole) QSO – of Morrinsville. For services as a welfare worker.
- (Janet) Marie Warren Shroff CVO – of Wellington. For services as Secretary of the Cabinet and Clerk of the Executive Council of New Zealand.
- Gordon William Shroff – of Wellington. For public services, lately with the Ministry of Foreign Affairs and Trade.
- Dr Elizabeth Ann Smales – of Wellington. For services to the hospice movement.
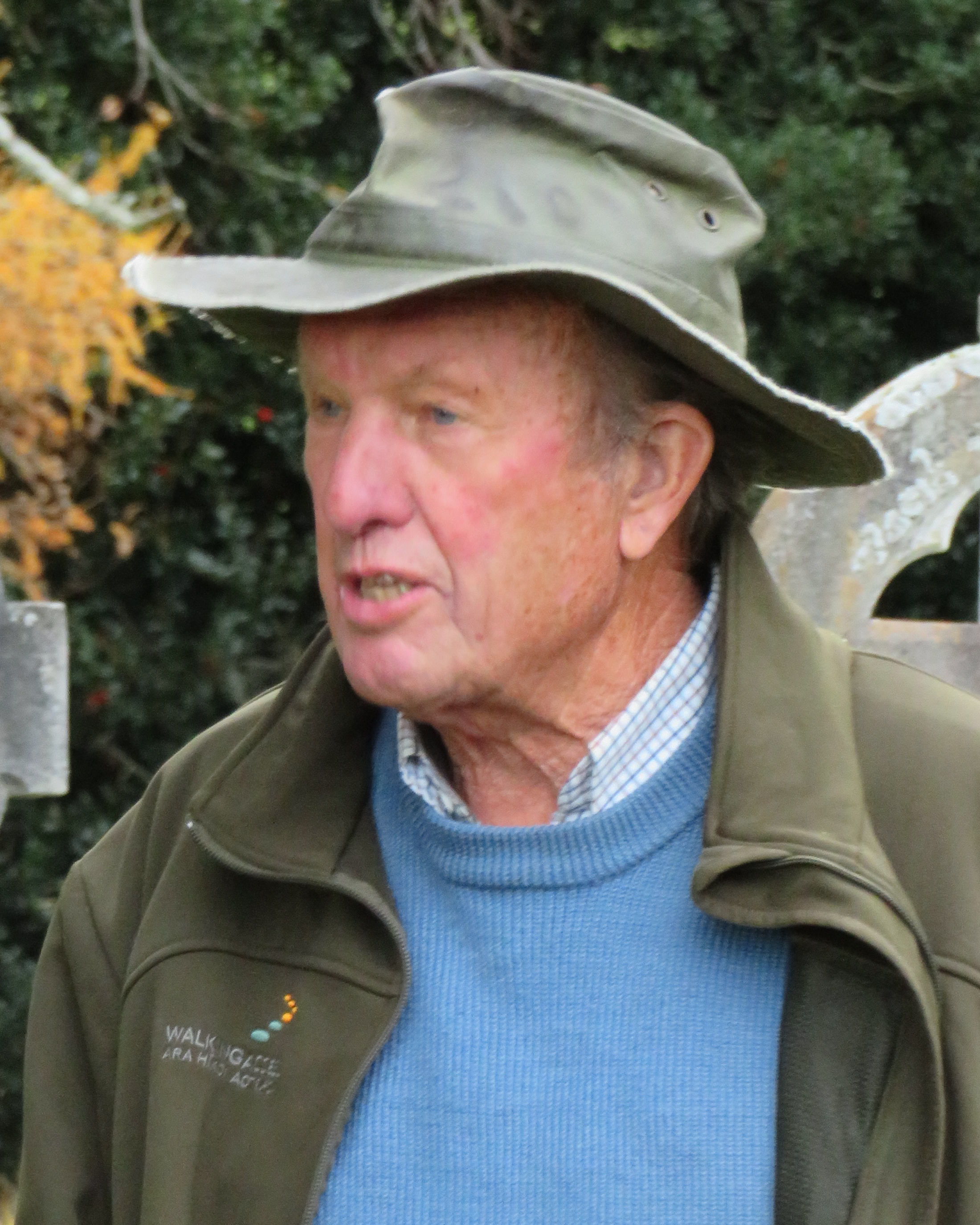
John Acland

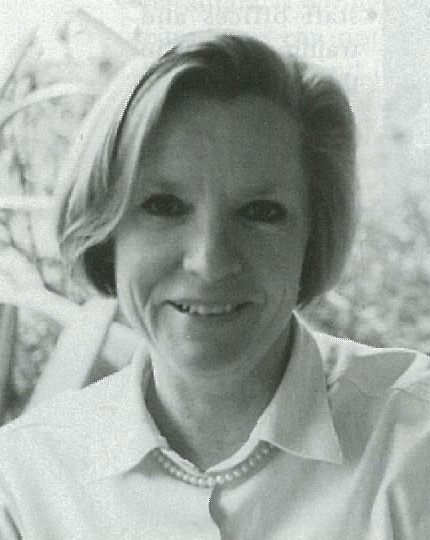
Judy McGregor

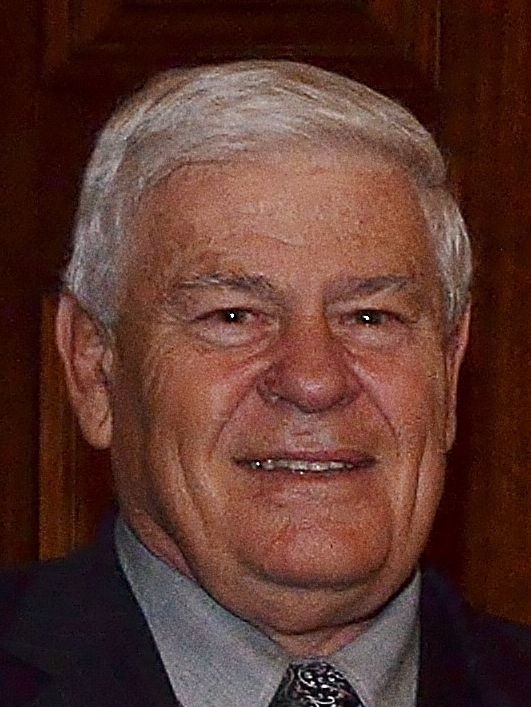
Basil Morrison

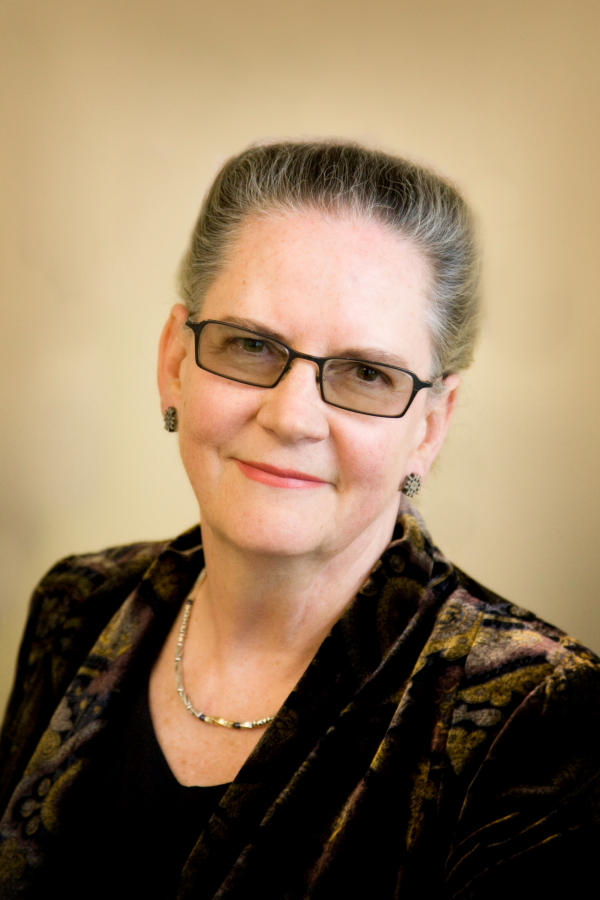
Marie Shroff

=== Officer (ONZM) ===
- Frederick George Anderson – of Manukau City. For services to the trade union movement.
- Jean Gray Ashby – of North Shore City. For services to bowls.
- Air Commodore David Anthony Bamfield ADC – Royal New Zealand Air Force.
- Peter Jack Berg – of Auckland. For services to the forestry industry.
- Nigel Roderick Brown – of Riverton. For services to painting and printmaking.
- Ian James Calder – of Raumati Beach. For services to the family and children.
- Dr Sally Casswell – of Auckland. For services to health research.
- Michael Gary Cooper – of North Shore City. For services as a wine writer.
- Susan Elspeth Gaddis (Susan Smith) JP – of Auckland. For services to music.
- Rangikaiamokura Wirihana Hetet – of Lower Hutt. For services as a Māori master carver.
- Athol Robert Hutton – of Kaikohe. For services to business and the community.
- Irene Mary Lake – of Wellington. For public services.
- Dr Beverley-Anne Lawton – of Wellington. For services to women's health.
- Dr Alan Wayne Limmer – of Hastings. For services to wine-making.
- Timothy John Mordaunt – of Palmerston North. For services to the community.
- Dr Lesley Marie Nicol – of Invercargill. For services to netball.
- Susan Flora Paterson – of Wellington. For services to ballet.
- Margaret Annie Reeve – of Christchurch. For services to education and the community.
- Emeritus Professor Weston James Sandle – of Dunedin. For services to science.
- Venetia Mary Sherson – of Hamilton. For services to journalism.
- Michael Andrew Stedman – of Dunedin. For services to television.
- Grahame Charles Sydney – of Dunedin. For services to painting.
- Richard Leslie Taylor – of Wellington. For services to design and the film industry.
- (Robert) Philip Temple – of Dunedin, currently in Berlin, Germany. For services to literature.
- Alison Barbara Thom – of Kaikohe. For services to the community.
- Gavin Neil Wilton – of Timaru. For services to surgery.

Additional

- Brigadier Louis Joseph Gardiner – Brigadiers' List, New Zealand Army.
- Commander Andrew Grant Aubrey Watts – Royal New Zealand Navy.
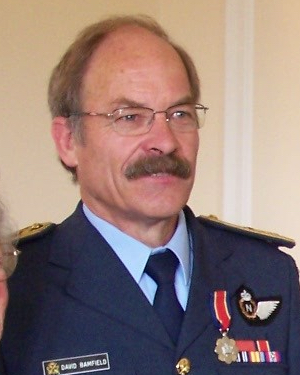
David Bamfield

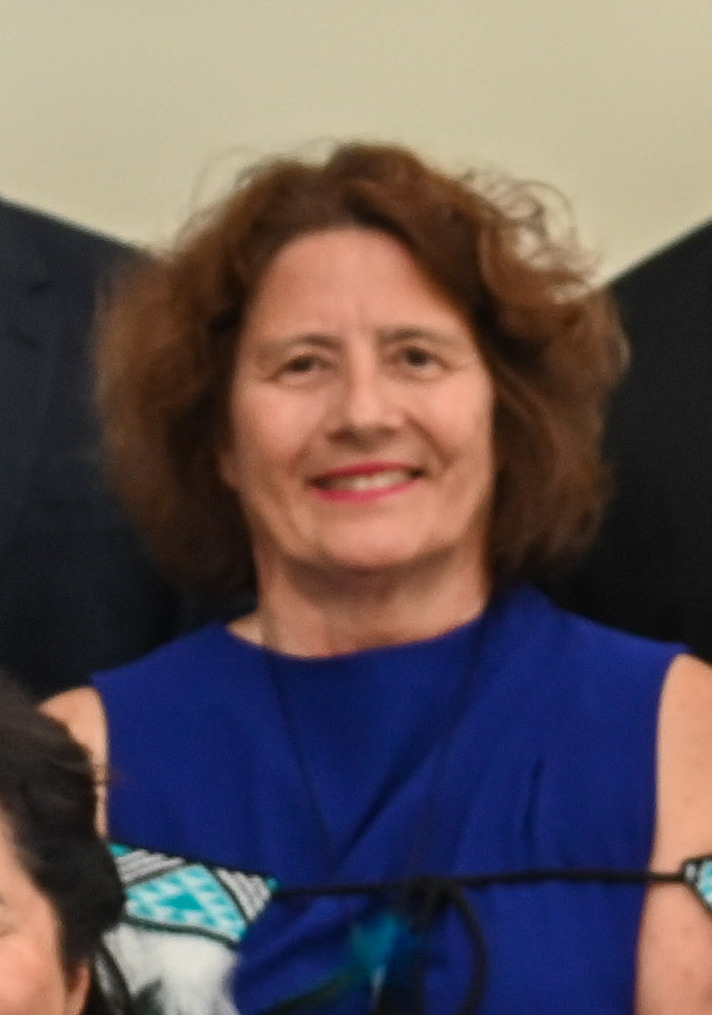
Bev Lawton

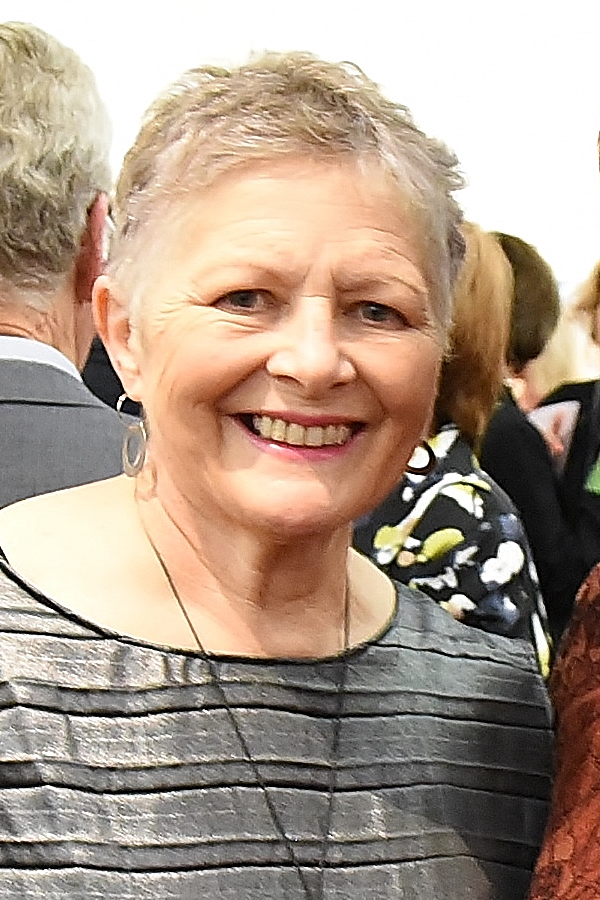
Sue Paterson

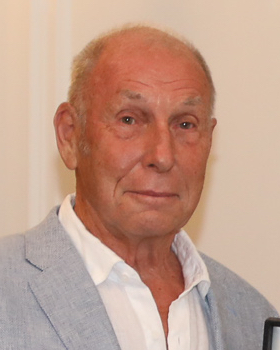
Grahame Sydney

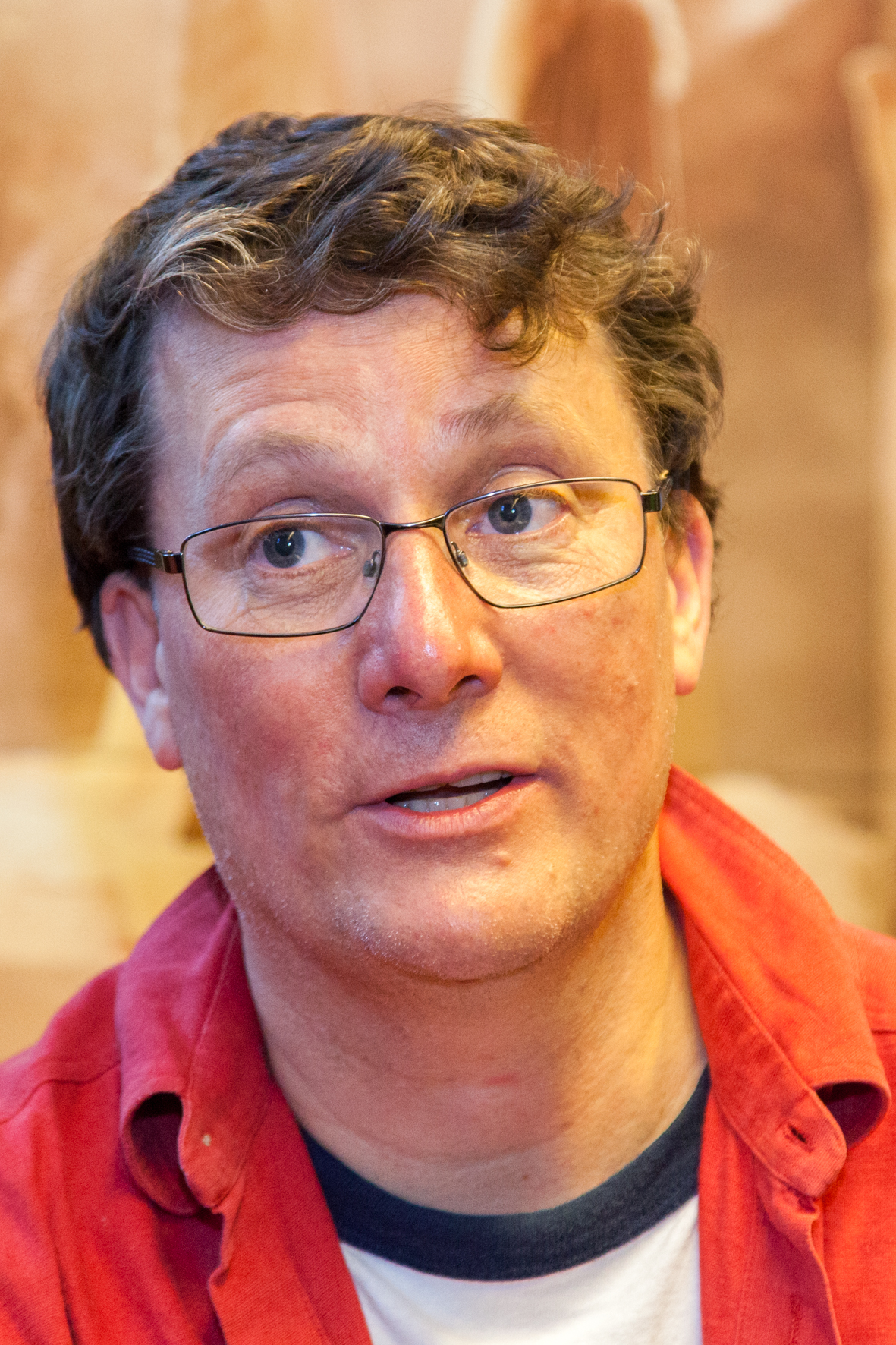
Richard Taylor

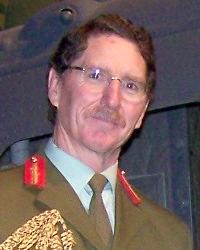
Lou Gardiner

=== Member (MNZM) ===
- Pinky Shirleyanne Agnew – of Wellington. For services to entertainment.
- Flight Sergeant Michael John Banks – Royal New Zealand Air Force.
- Barbara Ann Beckett – of Upper Hutt. For services to the sheep-breeding industry.
- William James Bracks – of Te Puke. For services to industry.
- (Wallace) Ross Bramwell JP – of Napier. For services to local government.
- Professor Margaret Anne Brimble – of Auckland. For services to science.
- Robyn Denise Broughton – of Invercargill. For services to netball and the community.
- Nikola Jean Caro – of Auckland. For services to the film industry.
- Linda Susan Constable – of Rangiora. For services to the community.
- Trelise Pamela Cooper – of Auckland. For services to the fashion industry.
- Cedric Bernard Cudby – of Lower Hutt. For services to basketball.
- Anne Paton Denton – of Havelock North. For services to the community.
- (Frances) Anne Else – of Wellington. For services to literature.
- Warrant Officer Class One Paul Stephen Galloway – Royal Regiment of New Zealand Artillery.
- Gail Lynette Gibson – of Wellington; inspector, New Zealand Police.
- Stephen Bruce Gurney – of Christchurch. For services to endurance sport.
- Flight Sergeant Michael Stephen Hennessy – Royal New Zealand Air Force.
- David Hill – of New Plymouth. For services to literature.
- Gavin Ross Jones – of Auckland; detective inspector, New Zealand Police.
- Captain Kevin John Keat – Royal New Zealand Navy.
- Johan Klisser – of North Shore City. For services to the baking industry.
- Mark Frank Lammas – of Palmerston North; superintendent, New Zealand Police.
- David Alexander Lawrie – of Pukekohe. For services to conservation.
- Dr Arthur William Lewis – of Wellington. For services to medicine and medical law.
- Jeanne Macaskill – of Wellington. For services to the arts and the community.
- Anthony Weymouth McLeod – of Havelock North; inspector, New Zealand Police. For services in the Solomon Islands.
- (Annie) Vivienne (Armstrong) Mountfort – of Christchurch. For services to art.
- Therese Frances O'Connell – of New Plymouth. For services to the trade-union movement.
- Lorae Ann Parry – of Wellington. For services to the performing arts.
- (Harold) David Pawsey – of Wellington. For services to the New Zealand Symphony Orchestra.
- Jennie Christina Reid – of Wellington. For services to the community.
- Ronald John Ritchie – of Wellington. For services to the community.
- Anna Catherine Rowberry – of Auckland. For services to netball.
- (Margaret) Anne Rush – of Nelson. For services to the arts.
- John Charles Searle – of Mount Maunganui. For services to the New Zealand Red Cross Society.
- Stanley Charles Seear JP – of Dunedin. For services to bowls and the community.
- Grant William Sharman – of Pukekohe. For services to persons with disabilities.
- Raymond William Shearman – of Christchurch. For services to motorcycling.
- Anthony Jon (Tony) Simpson – of Wellington. For services to historical research.
- Graham Frederick Smart – of Picton. For services to medicine and the community.
- Barrymore Reginald (Barrie) Smith JP – of Stratford. For services to the community.
- Ellie Smith – of Wellington. For services to the theatre.
- Squadron Leader Llanwyn Andrew Smith – Royal New Zealand Air Force (Retired).
- Elizabeth Edwina Smither JP – of New Plymouth. For services to literature.
- Ian Francis Thompson JP – of Hawke's Bay. For services to journalism and the community.
- Julie (Jools) Bethridge Topp – of Auckland. For services to entertainment.
- Lynda Bethridge Topp – of Auckland. For services to entertainment.
- Chaplain Class One Julian Patrick Wagg QHC – Colonels' Special List, New Zealand Army.
- Karen Walker – of Auckland. For services to the fashion industry.
- Dale Esther Wortman – of Paraparaumu Beach. For services to netball.

Additional

- Captain Gary John Shaw – Royal New Zealand Infantry Regiment.
- Warrant Officer Class One Daniel Lawrence Broughton – Royal New Zealand Infantry Regiment.
- Chief Petty Officer Electronic Warfare Instructor Lafaele Tugaga – Royal New Zealand Navy.
- Staff Sergeant Brent Douglas Wilson – The Corps of Royal New Zealand Engineers.
- Sergeant Craigh Walter Ross – Royal New Zealand Air Force.

Honorary

- Shuzo Tsuchiya – of Hokkaido, Japan. For services to New Zealand–Japan relations.
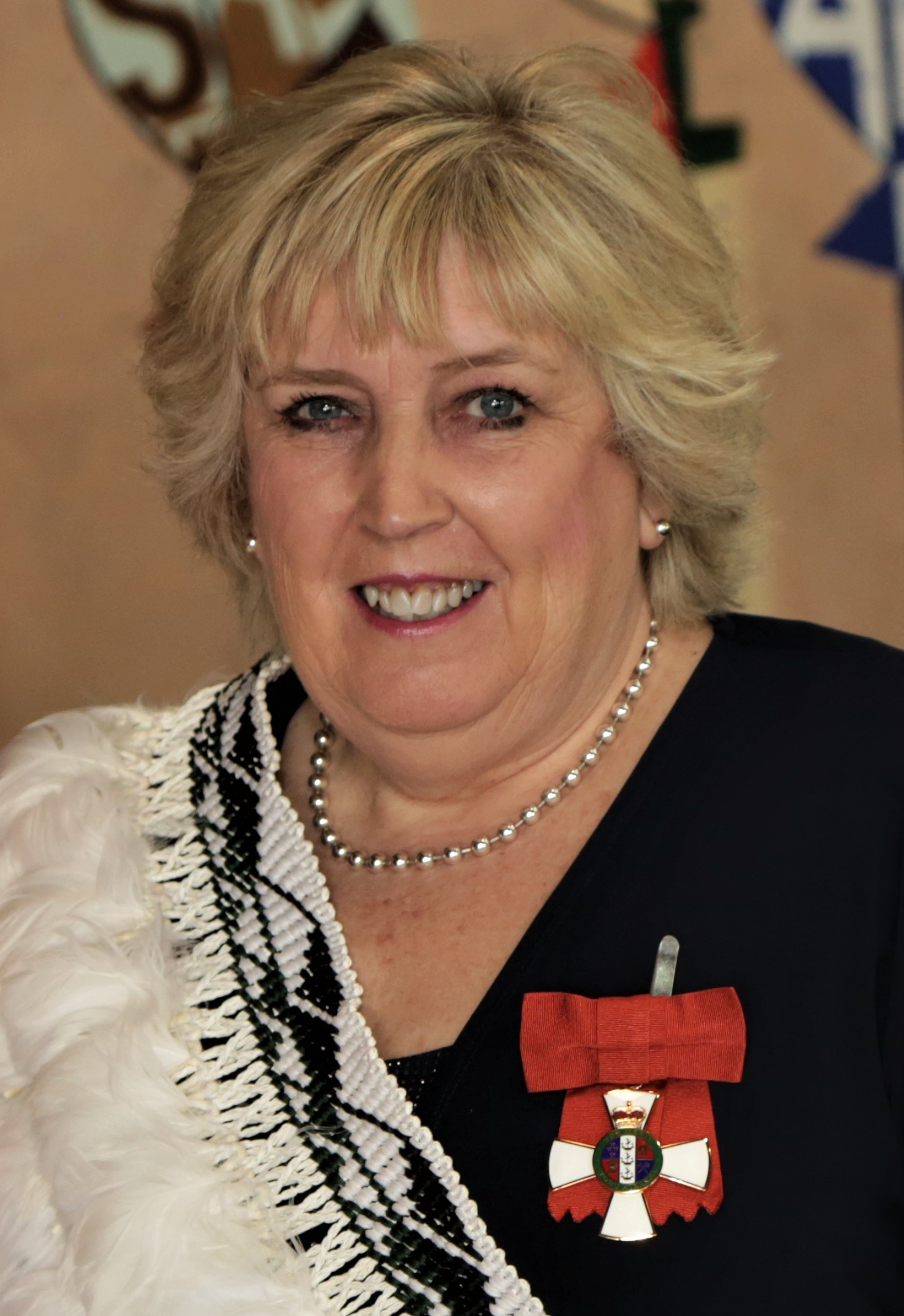
Margaret Brimble

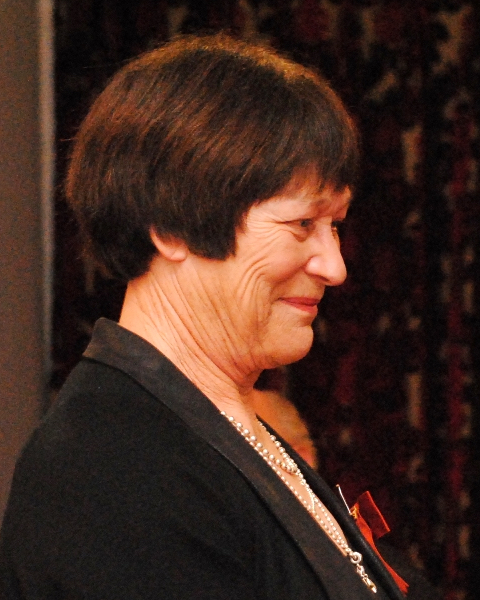
Robyn Broughton

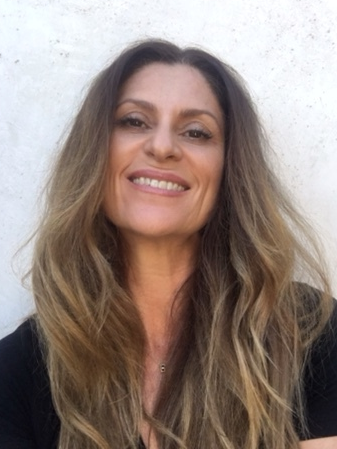
Niki Caro

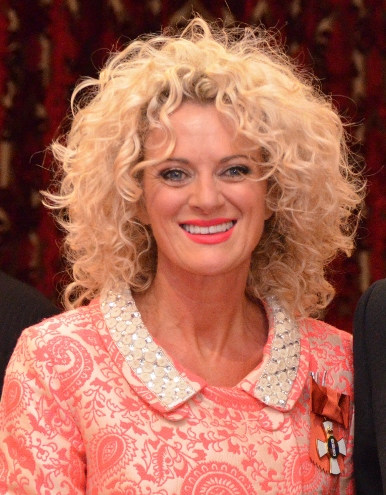
Trelise Cooper

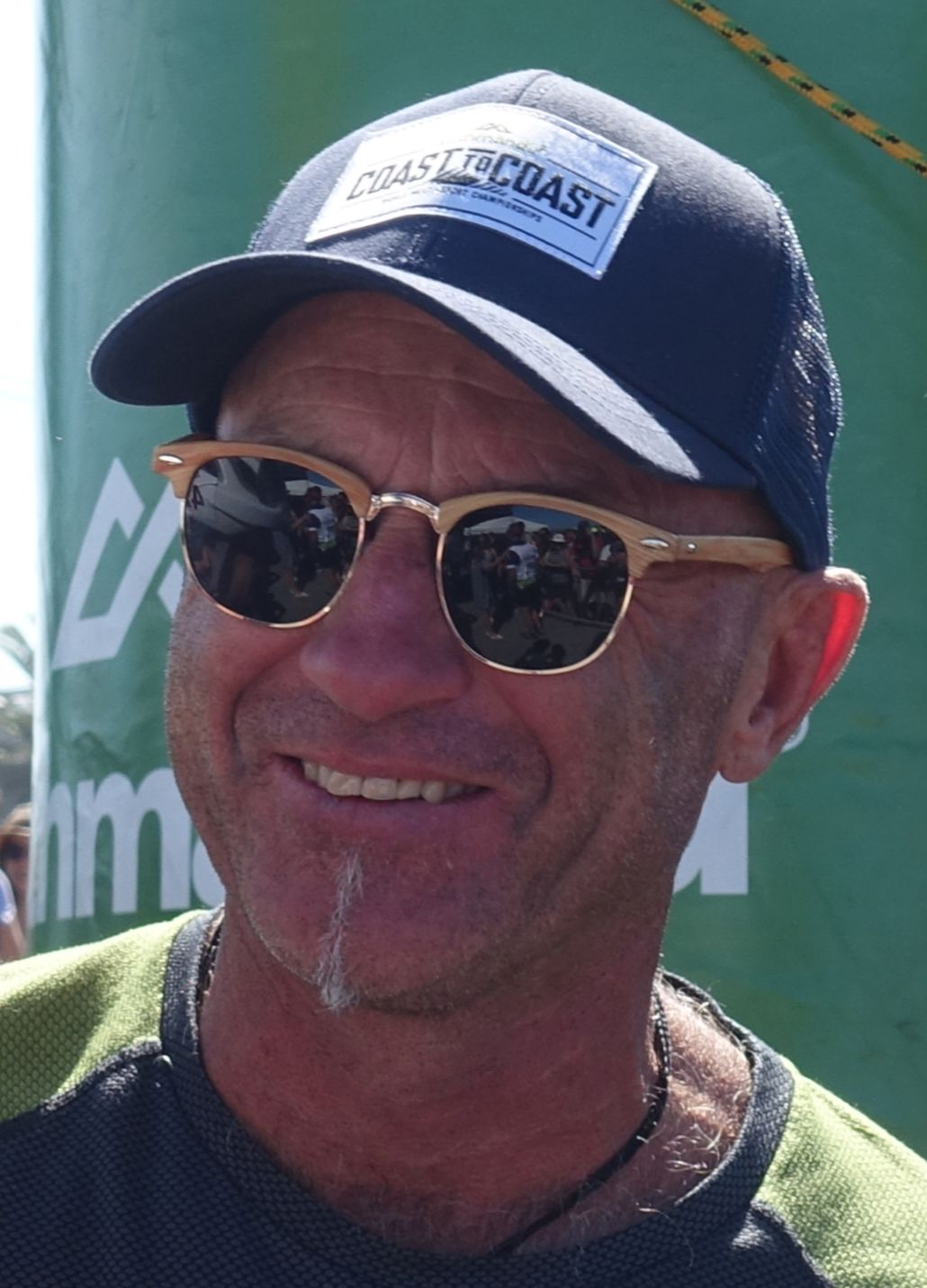
Steve Gurney

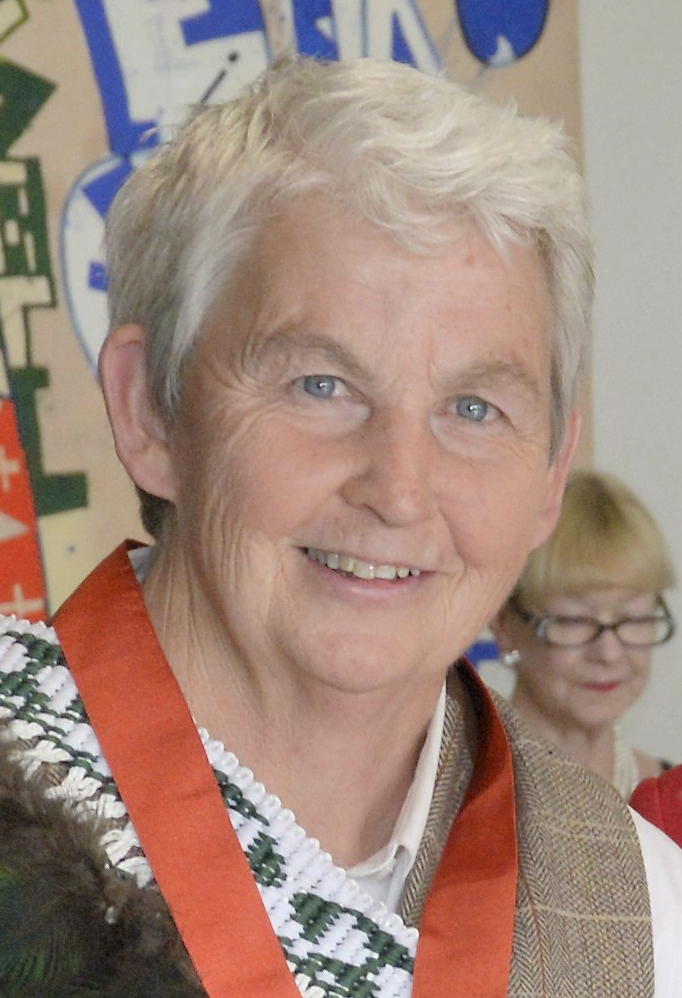
Jools Topp

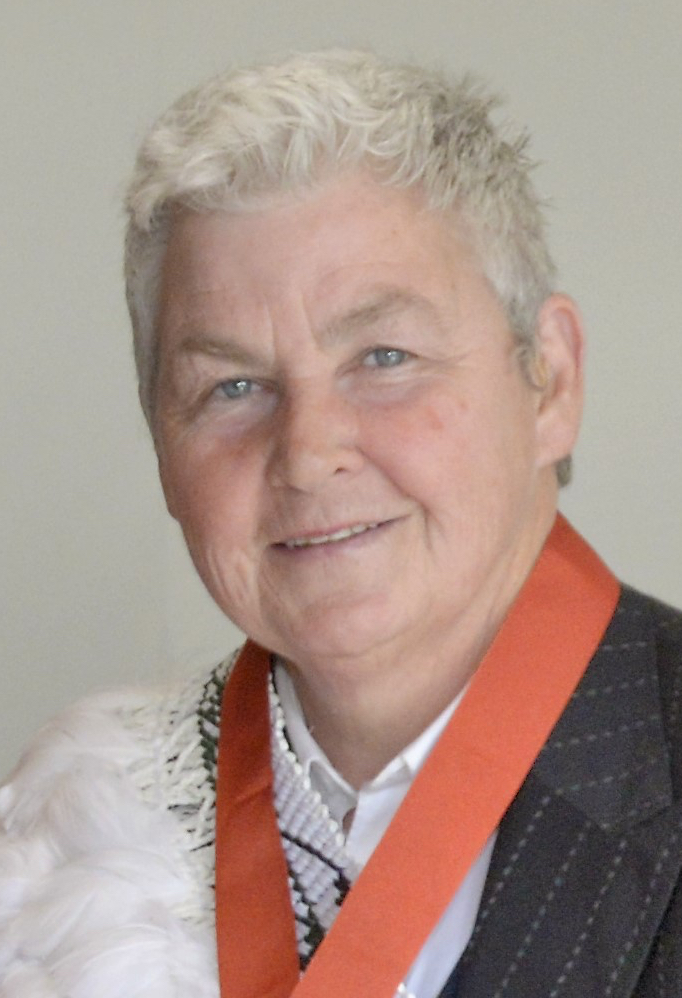
Lynda Topp

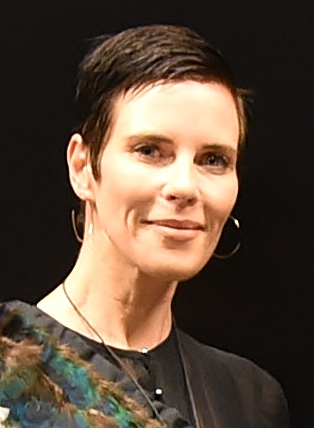
Karen Walker

== Companion of the Queen's Service Order (QSO) ==
=== For community service ===
- Dr Linnie Bryant Calvert – of Gulf Province, Papua New Guinea.
- Mate Huatahi Kaiwai – of Ruatoria.
- John Hoani Mahia – of Rotorua.
- Mihi Keita Namana – of Masterton.
- Elizabeth Jane Prichard – of Auckland.
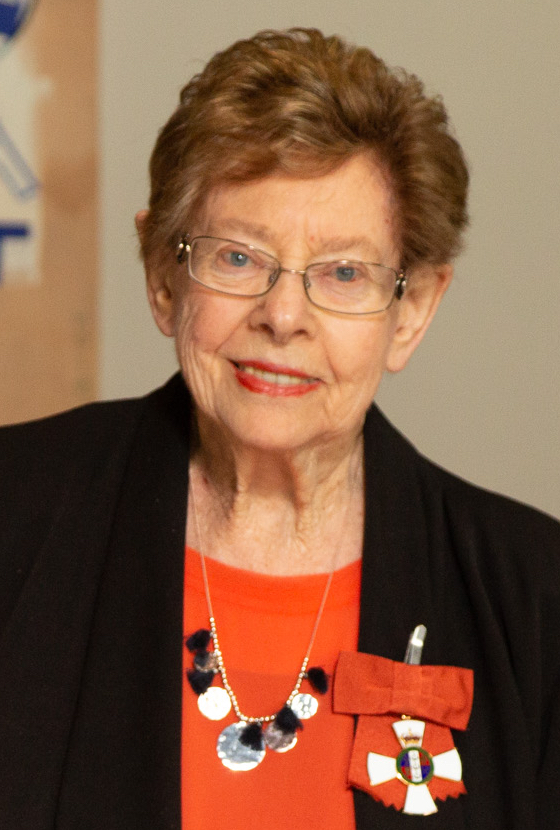
Jane Prichard

=== For public services ===
- Robert John Alston CMG – of London, England.
- Dr Annette Louise Beautrais – of Christchurch.
- Grahame Walter Hall JP – of Rotorua.
- Georgina Kingi – of Hastings.
- The Honourable Sandra Rose Te Hakamatua Lee-Vercoe JP – of Auckland, currently in Niue.
- Adjunct Professor David John Douglas Macdonald – of Wellington.
- Allyn Desmond Pyster – of Manukau City.
- The Honourable Derek Francis Quigley – of Auckland.
- Judith Ethel Whitcombe – of Porirua.
- Priscilla Jane Williams – of Wellington.
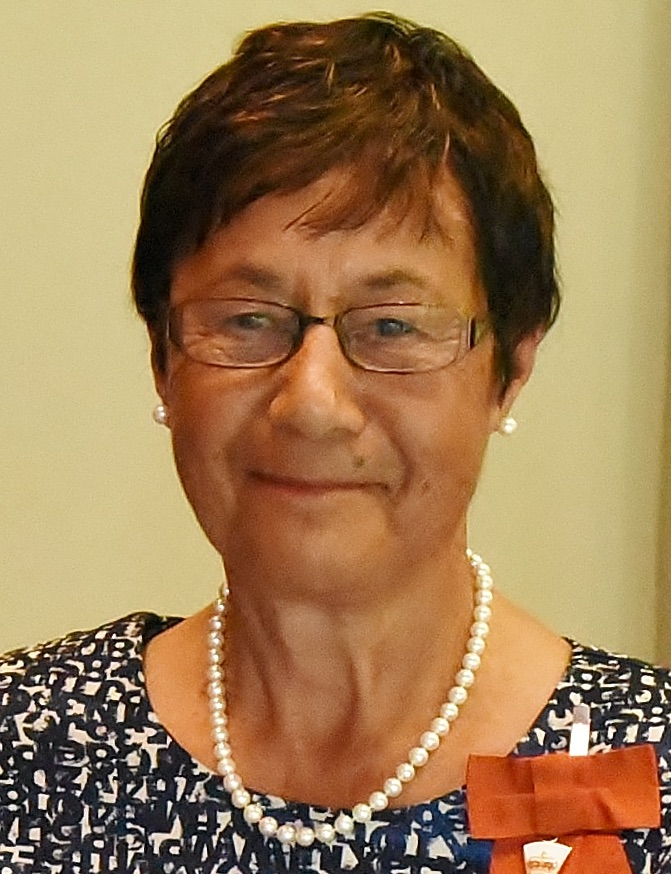
Georgina Kingi

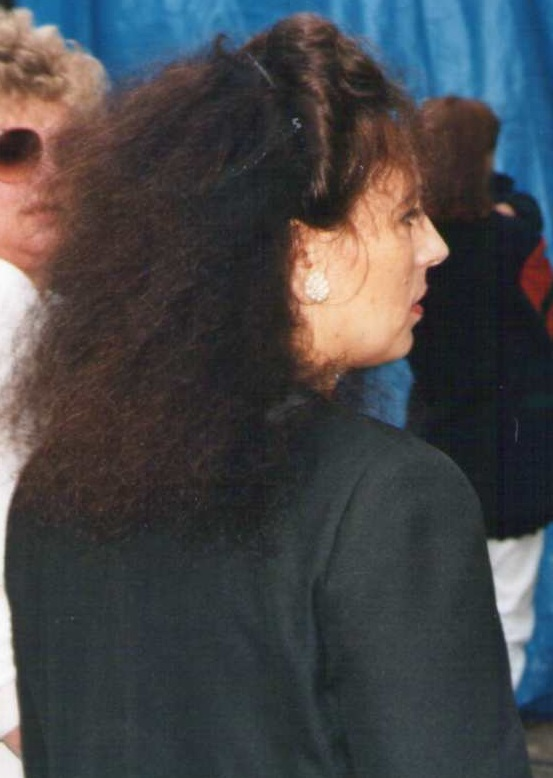
Sandra Lee-Vercoe

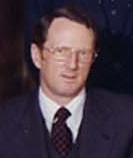
Derek Quigley

== Queen's Service Medal (QSM) ==
=== For community service ===
- Mathew Bruce Baird JP – of Hokitika.
- Florence (Flory) Berghan – of Kaitaia.
- Jill Marie Braddick – of Mangawhai.
- Johanna Mere Risk Brens – of Waitakere City.
- Angela Bridget Capes – of Whanganui.
- Noeleen Zeta Colligan – of Westport.
- Alister John Cotterell – of Timaru.
- Dayani Gonsalkorale – of Porirua.
- Dermot Remington (Derry) Gordon – of Christchurch.
- Bronwyn Gray JP – of Auckland.
- Merran Kempthorne Hain – of Gisborne.
- Roland Henry Hammond JP – of Tauranga.
- Olive Oriwia Isaacs JP – of Gisborne.
- Constance Lydia Evans Kirk Johnson – of Auckland.
- Te-Riaki Dawn Rae Kottier – of Lyttelton.
- Maurice Aubrey Le Fevre – of Palmerston North.
- Estella Hin Ling Lee – of Auckland.
- Zismore Victor Lurajud – of Timaru.
- Wilfred Marley JP – of North Shore City.
- Norman John (Pat) Martin – of Motueka.
- Ian Ross Middlemiss JP – of Christchurch.
- Ronald Ng Hoy Fong JP – of Auckland.
- Ethna Frances Rouse – of Christchurch.
- Andrew Sarich – of Kaikohe.
- Kataraina Puketapu Sarich – of Kaikohe.
- Pramjit Rai (Jeet) Suchdev – of Auckland.
- James Henare Te Tuhi – of Te Kōpuru.
- Desmond John Wallace – of Wellington.
- Raymond Leslie Wilson – of Oamaru.
- Fiona Jocelyn Wright JP – of Raumati Beach.
- John Salters Moore Young – of Auckland.
- Wendy Merilyn Zemanek – of Lower Hutt.

Honorary

- Andreas Wilhelmus (Dries) Arts – of Putāruru.

=== For public services ===
- Moya Eva Badham – of Hamilton East.
- Beverley Lucy Cathcart JP – of Lower Hutt.
- Rosemary Beatrice Cathcart – of Auckland.
- Verdon John Friel Chettleburgh ED – of Palmerston North.
- Roy Clifford Clements – of Waitakere City.
- Michael Anthony Cohen – of North Shore City.
- Peter Croft – of Renwick.
- John William De Lury – of Invercargill; sergeant, New Zealand Police.
- Mary Constance Dillon – of Tauranga.
- Elizabeth Ada Duggan JP – of Alexandra.
- Wendy Mary Fletcher – of Manukau City.
- Lala Frazer – of Dunedin.
- Gwen Freese JP – of Northland.
- Kenneth Elvin Graham JP – of Auckland.
- Valda Rosalie Hill – of Wellington.
- (Leonard) Paul Hobbs – of Te Awamutu.
- David Norman Jenkinson – of Wellington.
- Darryl Thomas Johnston – of Waitakere City; senior fire fighter, Waitakere Fire District.
- Peter Thomas Johnston – of Christchurch.
- Barbara Huia Kingi – of Feilding.
- Trevor William Langley JP – of Napier.
- Yvonne Annette Lyons – of Auckland.
- Te Winitana (Winston) Tupotahi Maniapoto – of Manukau City.
- Dr John Alexander McLennan – of Havelock North.
- Rangitukua Moeka'a – of Papatoetoe.
- Alexandra Laura (Sandi) Morrison – of North Shore City.
- Gwen Emily Nash JP – of Waitakere City.
- Kantilal Bhagabhai (Ken) Patel JP – of Wellington.
- Ivan Thomas Pickens – of Waitakere City.
- William Alfred Renall – of Waiuku; lately chief fire officer, Waiuku Volunteer Fire Brigade.
- Marie Amy Rooke – of Auckland.
- Lieutenant Commander John Vincent Smith – Royal New Zealand Naval Volunteer Reserve, of Tūrangi.
- Erich Speck – of Wainuiomata; chief fire officer, Wainuiomata Volunteer Fire Brigade.
- Pamela Jean Miley Terry – of Rotorua.
- Teiri Tinomana – of Karamea; lately chief fire officer, Karamea Volunteer Fire Brigade.
- Maureen Dawn Harriet Toms JP – of Johnsonville.
- Malcolm Roderick Tulloch JP – of Mataura.
- Fa'amanuia Va'aelua – of Auckland; sergeant, New Zealand Police.
- Trevor Raymond Webb JP – of Auckland.
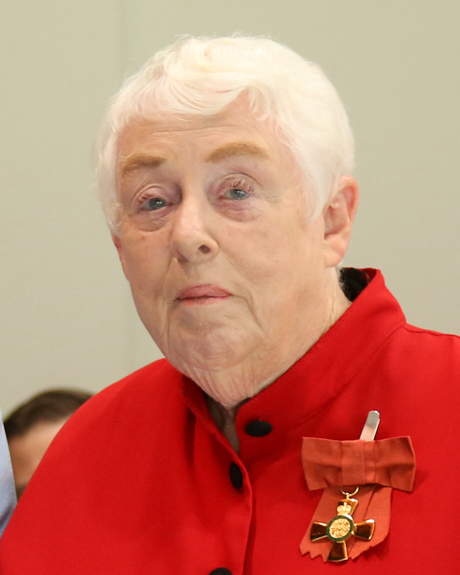
Rosemary Cathcart

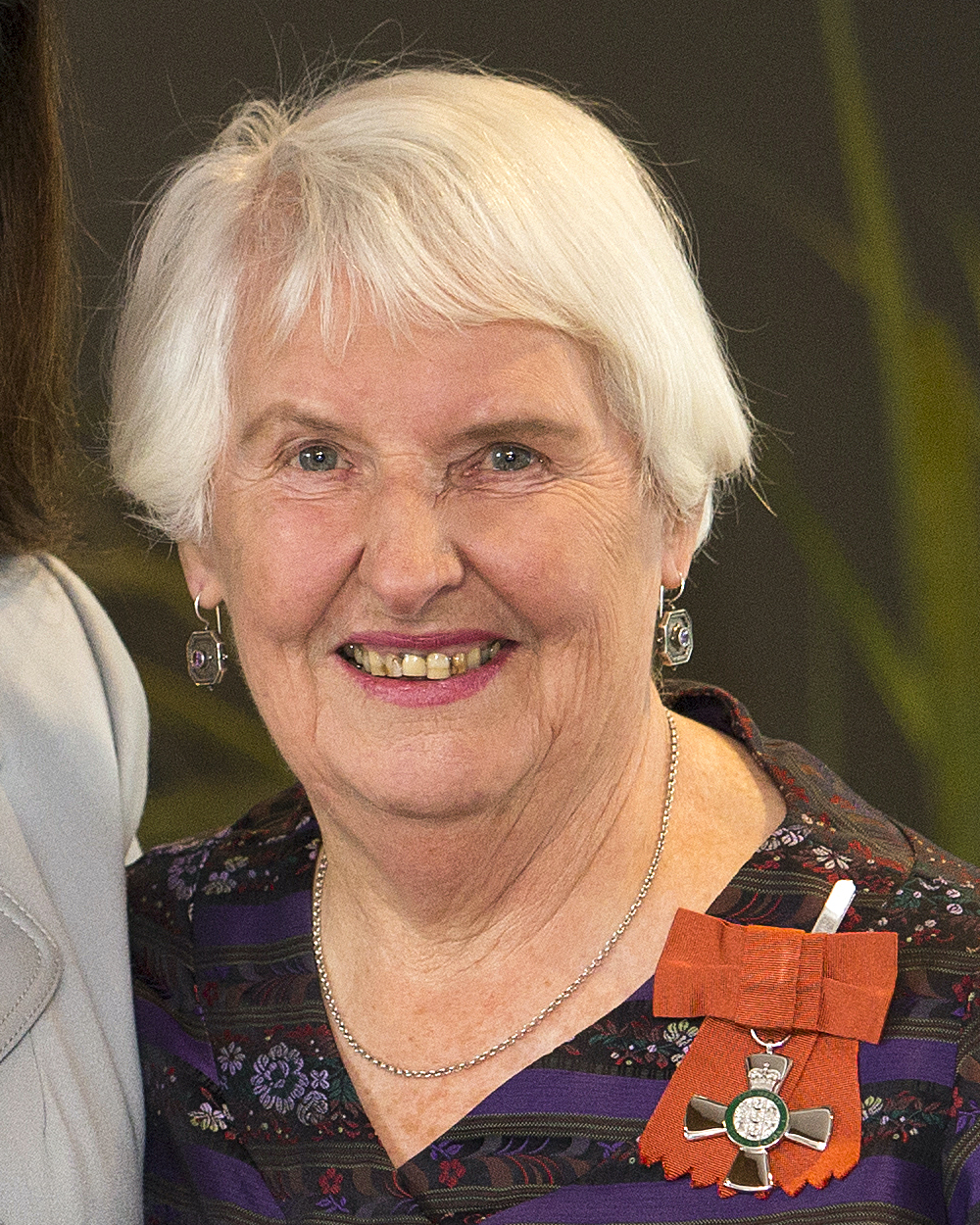
Lala Frazer
