= Wes Sandle =

New Zealand physicist (1935–2020)

Wes Sandle ONZM FRSNZ
- Born: Weston James Sandle; 19 March 1935; Christchurch, New Zealand
- Died: 19 February 2020 (aged 84); Dunedin, New Zealand
- Education: University of California, Berkeley
- Scientific career
- Fields: Physics
- Workplaces: University of Otago
- Thesis: ^{19}F nuclear magnetic resonance in the canted antiferromagnet KMnF_{3} (1968)

Weston James Sandle ONZM FRSNZ (19 March 1935 – 19 February 2020) was a New Zealand physicist who specialised in the study of lasers. He was a professor at the University of Otago.

== Biography ==
Born in Christchurch on 19 March 1935, Sandle was educated at Christchurch Boys' High School, and went on to study at Canterbury University College, graduating Master of Science with first-class honours in mathematics in 1958. He was awarded a King George VI Memorial Fellowship by the English Speaking Union of the Commonwealth to study at the University of California, Berkeley, where he earned a Master of Arts degree, and then a PhD in physics in 1968. The title of his doctoral thesis was ^{19}F nuclear magnetic resonance in the canted antiferromagnet KMnF_{3}.

Appointed to the faculty of the University of Otago in 1963, Sandle rose to become a full professor in 1986. He served as head of the Department of Physics at Otago for a time, and retired in 2001, when he was accorded the title of professor emeritus. Much of Sandle's research was concerned with laser theory and the application of lasers, including laser stability, Raman lasers, and laser cavity resonators. He was also interested in optical switches, optical pumping, optical bistability and optical chaos.

In 1998, Sandle was elected a Fellow of the Royal Society of New Zealand, and he was also a Fellow of the New Zealand Institute of Physics. In the 2004 New Year Honours, he was appointed an Officer of the New Zealand Order of Merit, for services to science.

Sandle was predeceased by his wife, Pat, to whom he was married for 56 years, in 2019. He died in Dunedin on 19 February 2020.

== Selected works ==
- Sandle, Wes; Manson, Peter; Warrington, Don (1998). Chaotic polarization behavior in a Raman laser. LEOS'98, 11th Annual Meeting, IEEE Lasers and Electro-Optics Society. Vol. 1. IEEE. pp. 407–408.
- Dodd, J. N.; Sandle, W. J.; Zissermann, D. (1967). "Study of resonance fluorescence in cadmium: modulation effects and lifetime measurements". Proceedings of the Physical Society. 92 (2): 497. doi:10.1088/0370-1328/92/2/327.
- Boshier, M. G.; Sandle, W. J. (1982). "Self-focussing in a vapour of two-state atoms". Optics Communications. 42 (5): 371–376. doi:10.1016/0030-4018(82)90251-6.
- Sandle, W. J.; Gallagher, Alan (1981). "Optical bistability by an atomic vapor in a focusing Fabry-Perot cavity". Physical Review A. 24 (4): 2017. doi:10.1103/PhysRevA.24.2017.
