= Stefania Residori =

Italian physicist

Stefania Residori is an Italian, French physicist who works in France as a research director at HOASYS SAS, an optical equipment company. Her research has involved optical chaos, rogue waves, slow light, holographic interferometry, and pattern formation in nonlinear optics and liquid crystals. At HOASYS SAS, she has also been involved in the development of equipment for spectral analysis of the eye and its applications in detecting eye disease.

== Education and career ==
Residori studied physics at the University of Bologna, earning a laurea in 1989. She completed a PhD at the University of Florence in 1993.

From 1994 to 1998 she worked as a researcher for the National Institute of Optics of the National Research Council (Italy), in Florence. In 1998 she became a director of research for the French National Centre for Scientific Research (CNRS) at the Institut Non Linéaire de Nice, a joint research unit of the CNRS and the Université Nice-Sophia-Antipolis.

== Recognition ==
Optica named Residori as a 2022 Optica Fellow, "for outstanding contributions to nonlinear optics and nonlinear dynamics of liquid crystals, and for applications to vortex generations and slow light holographic interferometry".
