= John Bollard =

John Bollard may refer to:

- Jean Bolland (1596–1665), sometimes referred to as John Bolland, Flemish Roman Catholic priest and hagiographer
- John Bollard (born 1965), former American Roman Catholic seminarian who sued the Society of Jesus
- John Bollard (judge) (1940–2009), judge of the Environment Court of New Zealand
- John Bollard (politician) (1839–1915), member of the Parliament of New Zealand
