= Jane Prichard =

New Zealand women's leader (1936–2023)

Jane Prichard QSO CNZM
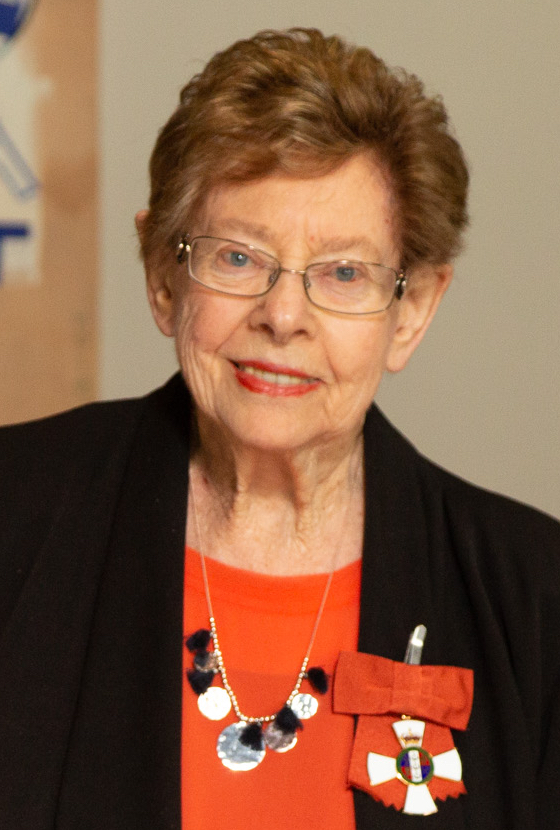
- Prichard in 2019
- Born: 15 February 1936
- Died: 2 December 2023; North Shore Hospital
- Awards: Companion of the New Zealand Order of Merit, Companion of the Queen's Service Order

Elizabeth Jane Prichard QSO CNZM (nee Ballantine, 15 February 1936 – 2 December 2023) was a New Zealand women's leader. She was the founder of Pacific Women's Watch New Zealand, held roles in the National Council of Women of New Zealand and the International Council of Women, and was the president of Presbyterian Women. In 2004 Prichard was appointed a Companion of the Queen's Service Order for community service. In 2019 Prichard was appointed a Companion of the New Zealand Order of Merit for services to women.

== Early life and education ==
Prichard was brought up in Herbert, Otago. She attended the University of Otago, earning a Bachelor of Arts in 1956. She worked for two years in Wellington before marrying Owen Prichard and moving to Auckland. The couple had two children.

== Work ==
Prichard joined the Federation of University Women (now Graduate Women) in Auckland, as well as taking on roles in the Presbyterian Church. Prichard was concerned with ensuring women's voices were heard, and especially women from Pacific and Asian communities across the Pacific. From 1990 she was a member of the Auckland branch of the National Council of Women of New Zealand (NCWNZ), and served on the board from 1996. From 1998 to 2002 she was the national vice president. Prichard held several roles in the International Council of Women (ICW), including six years as vice president, and she was also president of Presbyterian Women. Prichard worked to improve the representation of women across the Pacific. She founded the International Council of Women's Asia-Pacific Regional Council, and fundraised to send women from Pacific Islands to the ICW meetings. Prichard founded the Pacific Women's Watch NZ, and was president for two periods, with the second from 2007 until 2014. Prichard also founded Bridgebuilders International in New Zealand, which worked to build national networks for religious women's groups.

Prichard worked with Shakti Refuge to prevent forced marriages of minors through the passing of the Marriage (Court Consent to Marriage of Minors) Amendment Bill. This bill changed the requirement for consent for marriage of a minor to a Family Court Judge rather than the parents. Prichard worked to uphold the Convention for the Elimination of All Forms of Discrimination Against Women (CEDAW). She attended every United Nations Commission on the Status of Women annual conference from 1997 until 2011.

Prichard wrote a memoir of her life, Creating space, which was published in 2023. Prichard died in North Shore Hospital, Auckland on 2 December 2023.

== Honours and awards ==
In the 2004 New Year Honours, Prichard was appointed a Companion of the Queen's Service Order for community service. In the 2019 Queen's Birthday Honours, Prichard was appointed a Companion of the New Zealand Order of Merit for services to women. In 2023 she was elected a life member of the National Council of Women of New Zealand.

== Published work ==
- Prichard, Jane (March 2023). Creating Space – An Experience of Gender. Auckland, NZ: Mary Egan Publishing. ISBN 9781991179845.
