= Deirdre Milne =

New Zealand rural community leader (1939–2026)

Dame Deirdre Milne DNZM QSO
- Born: Deirdre Glenna Boyes; 2 June 1939; Dunedin, New Zealand
- Died: 8 July 2026 (aged 87); Auckland, New Zealand
- Occupation: Barrister and solicitor
- Spouse: Donald Stewart Milne

Dame Deirdre Glenna Milne DNZM QSO (née Boyes; 2 June 1939 – 8 July 2026) was a New Zealand feminist active from the 1970s and a lawyer.

== Life and career ==
Milne was born Deirdre Glenna Boyes in Dunedin on 2 June 1939, one of two daughters of Lorna Brimfield Boyes (née Faigan) and George Hunter Boyes. Her father died in Wellington in 1943 while serving with the Royal New Zealand Air Force during World War II, and her mother never remarried. Boyes studied at Canterbury University College, graduating with a Bachelor of Arts degree in 1960. She also studied law and was admitted as a barrister and solicitor. She married Don Milne, a journalist who rose to become deputy editor of The New Zealand Herald.

She was a founding partner of Auckland law firm Milne Ireland Walker, retiring in about 1998, although she continued to work as a duty solicitor at the Auckland district court. Milne was active in the feminist movement. In 1973, she convened abortion workshops at the first United Women's Convention in Auckland. She was a founding member of the Women's Electoral Lobby in 1975 and the National Organisation for Women, and was a trustee of the Women's Refuge Foundation.

Milne was also involved in other professional and community groups. She served on the councils of the Auckland District Law Society and the University of Auckland, and chaired the ethics committees of Auckland Health and Unitec Institute of Technology. She was chair of the New Zealand AIDS Foundation and served as a director of the Yellow Bus Company. At the 1998 local elections she stood for a seat on the Auckland City Council in the Avondale-Roskill ward as a City Vision candidate, but was not elected.

Milne died in Auckland on 8 July 2026, at the age of 87.

== Honours and awards ==
In the 1990 Queen's Birthday Honours, Milne was appointed a Companion of the Queen's Service Order for public services. In 1993, she was awarded the New Zealand Suffrage Centennial Medal. In the 2004 New Year Honours, she was appointed a Distinguished Companion of the New Zealand Order of Merit, for services to women and the community, and in 2009, following the restoration of titular honours by the New Zealand government, she accepted redesignation as a Dame Companion of the New Zealand Order of Merit.
