= Sally Casswell =

New Zealand psychology academic

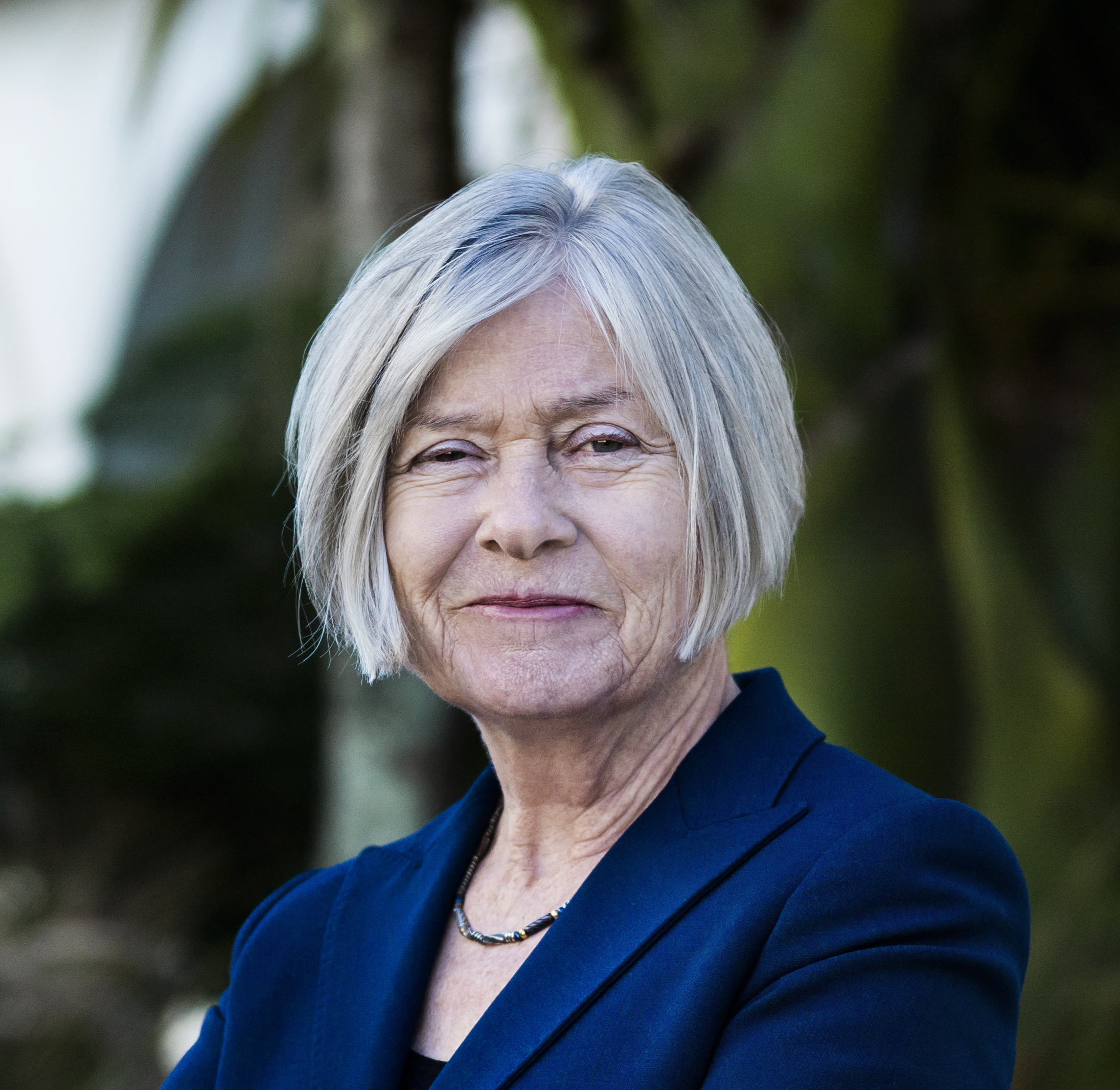
- Casswell in 2006
- Education: University of Otago
- Known for: Alcohol Policy and Psychological aspects of alcohol and other drugs
- Scientific career
- Fields: Psychology
- Workplaces: Massey University
- Thesis: Acute effects of cannabis intoxication. (1974)

Sally Casswell ONZM is a New Zealand academic, and as of 2019 is a full professor at the Massey University. She is a member of the WHO Expert Advisory Panel on Drug Dependence and Alcohol Problems and is Chair of the Scientific Advisory Board of the Global Alcohol Policy Alliance, and former Vice-President of the Kettil Bruun Society. She is a Fellow of the Royal Society of New Zealand and an Officer of the Order of New Zealand.

== Academic career ==
After a 1974 PhD titled 'Acute effects of cannabis intoxication' at the University of Otago, Casswell moved to Massey University, rising to full professor. She was the 2025 winner for the Award for Advancement of International Research Collaboration on Alcohol at the International Kettil Bruun Society for Social and Epidemiological Research on Alcohol.

Much of Casswell's work involves the public-health psychology, including issues such as alcohol regulation, recreational drug regulation and sugar taxes. She has argued in favour of a greater contribution of multinational alcohol companies to the costs of alcohol-related harms. Casswell leads the International Alcohol Control Policy Study which collects data from 40 countries on alcohol policy, alcohol use, and policy relevant behaviour aiming to benchmark the effectiveness of policy changes over time and with the aim to be comparable across countries.

== Selected works ==
- Beaglehole, Robert, Ruth Bonita, Richard Horton, Cary Adams, George Alleyne, Perviz Asaria, Vanessa Baugh et al. "Priority actions for the non-communicable disease crisis." The Lancet 377, no. 9775 (2011): 1438–1447.
- Casswell, Sally, Taisia Huckle, Karl Parker, Thomas Graydon‐Guy, June Leung, Charles Parry, Perihan Torun et al. "Effective alcohol policies are associated with reduced consumption among demographic groups who drink heavily." Alcohol: Clinical and Experimental Research 47, no. 4 (2023): 786-795.
- Casswell, Sally, Megan Pledger, and Rhonda Hooper. "Socioeconomic status and drinking patterns in young adults." Addiction 98, no. 5 (2003): 601–610.
- Casswell, Sally, Megan Pledger, and Sarah Pratap. "Trajectories of drinking from 18 to 26 years: identification and prediction." Addiction 97, no. 11 (2002): 1427–1437.
- Casswell, Sally, Karl Parker, Steve Randerson, Taisia Huckle, Lathika Athauda, Aravind Banavaram, Sarah Callinan et al. "Investigating indicators to assess and support alcohol taxation policy: Results from the International Alcohol Control (IAC) study." International Journal of Health Policy and Management 14 (2025): 8551.
- Casswell, Sally, and Thaksaphon Thamarangsi. "Reducing harm from alcohol: call to action." The Lancet 373, no. 9682 (2009): 2247–2257.
- Moodie, Rob, David Stuckler, Carlos Monteiro, Nick Sheron, Bruce Neal, Thaksaphon Thamarangsi, Paul Lincoln, Sally Casswell, and Lancet NCD Action Group. "Profits and pandemics: prevention of harmful effects of tobacco, alcohol, and ultra-processed food and drink industries." The lancet 381, no. 9867 (2013): 670–679.
- Connolly, Gary M., Sally Casswell, JIA‐FANG ZHANG, and Phil A. Silva. "Alcohol in the mass media and drinking by adolescents: a longitudinal study." Addiction 89, no. 10 (1994): 1255–1263.
