= 2009 swine flu pandemic in New Zealand =

2009 flu pandemic in New Zealand
- 500+ Confirmed cases 50+ Confirmed cases 5–49 Confirmed cases 1–4 Confirmed cases

- Deaths Confirmed cases Unconfirmed or suspected cases
- Disease: H1N1 Influenza 09 (Human swine influenza)
- Pathogen: H1N1
- First outbreak: Thought to be Central Mexico
- Arrival date: 25 April 2009
- Confirmed cases: 3,175
- Suspected cases: n/a
- Deaths: 69

The 2009 swine flu pandemic in New Zealand was caused by a novel strain of the A/H1N1 influenza virus. A total of 3,175 cases and 69 deaths were recorded, although a seroprevalence study estimated that around 800,000 individuals may have been infected during the initial wave of the pandemic.

== Outbreak history ==
On 25 April 2009 ten students from Rangitoto College, a secondary school in North Shore City, Auckland, exhibited influenza symptoms on returning from a three-week language trip to Mexico. All 22 students and three accompanying teachers from the trip and those in close contact with them were placed in voluntary home isolation and treated with oseltamivir. The ten students tested positive for an influenza A virus, with three of them later testing positive for swine flu. The symptoms were reportedly mild and all affected individuals have since recovered.

On 30 May 2009, New Zealand had 9 laboratory confirmed cases and 10 probable cases, while there were a further 30 suspected cases and 23 people in isolation being treated with Tamiflu. Confirmed cases have tested positive for the Mexican swine flu strain of influenza type A. Probable cases had tested positive for influenza type A after possible recent exposure to the Mexican strain. Suspected cases have flu symptoms after possible recent exposure to the Mexican strain. On 6 June a one-year-old boy from Manukau City was diagnosed with swine flu and several other people who had been exposed to him had gone into isolation.

On 8 June, the Ministry of Health confirmed three further cases of novel Influenza A(H1N1); bringing the national total to 17. This included the son of a Canterbury man who had recently flown into New Zealand from Los Angeles, as well as a passenger from that same flight and a further international flight from Melbourne. As with previous cases, they were isolated and are being treated with Tamiflu. The following day (9 June), the Ministry of Health reported two further cases. Both of these new cases travelled to New Zealand from Los Angeles on 31 May, and are currently in isolation with their close contacts. Concern was also raised after 19 people (16 students, two teachers and one parent) from Gisborne Boys' High School returned to New Zealand on 9 June, and five students began experiencing flu-like symptoms. ItA(H1N1) It was confirmed on 11 June that swabs taken from the students returned negative for novel Influenza.

On 17 June, there was a cumulative total of 127 confirmed cases of novel H1N1 influenza in the country. Some of these represent person to person transfers without a link to a person who had travelled recently meaning New Zealand has experienced a community level outbreak.

On 29 June 2009, there were 523 confirmed cases. There was 1 critical case in Hawkes Bay. The patient was said to have pre-existing medical conditions, but the doctors have put her condition down to swine flu.

On 7 July 2009, there were 1195 confirmed cases. There were 12 critical cases in Nationwide and 53 people had been hospitalised due to the flu.

According to a three-month-long study coordinated by the Australian and New Zealand Intensive Care Research Centre that was published in the New England Journal of Medicine, up to 20% of intensive care unit (ICU) beds overall were occupied by swine flu patients at the height of the pandemic in July. In New Zealand hospitals, about 25% of all ICU activity was pandemic-related and about 12% of patients hospitalised with swine flu were admitted to ICU. The surge of patients with H1N1 influenza placed substantial strain on staff and resources, hospitals were stretched to the very limit of resources and were at the point where possible alternatives had to be considered. Unlike seasonal influenza strains, which tend to hit elderly people and those of severe underlying health problems more heavily, many of those who became critically ill with the swine flu were babies and middle-aged people, pregnant women, the obese, Pacific Islanders, Māori and Aboriginal patients. Rates of severe illness among Pacific people were seven times higher than the average, while those of Maori were twice as high. Overall, about one-third of patients who was admitted to an ICU because of swine flu had no underlying health problem. The first batch of swine flu vaccine arrived in the country in September. Currently only frontline health workers were in line to get the vaccine, but the Health Ministry is considering on widening access to include other "at risk" groups.

On 21 October 2009, the Ministry of Health announced that the total number of death attributed to swine flu was 19, following a coroner's investigation of the 21 September death of a 35-year-old woman with underlying medical conditions in Waikato. The ministry expected the number to rise as the coroner completes investigations into a number of influenza-related deaths occurred over the last few months. Some students among a group visiting from Japan developed influenza in Christchurch in mid-October. Four tested positive for influenza H1N1, and a number of others had influenza-like symptoms. The ministry said it appeared that their illness originated in Japan. The group left New Zealand following treatment.

The death toll was later revised to 49 deaths in 2009, before a further 20 were killed during a second wave in 2010.

== Impact ==
The impact in New Zealand was monitored by health authorities and had resulted in school closures throughout the country. There had been multiple instances of community transmission, and threats to close the nation's borders.

== Seasonal flu ==
New Zealand had about 48,000 influenza cases in the 2008 flu season – 42% of which were type A – and approximately 100 deaths a year directly attributed to influenza viruses.

== Preparation ==
New Zealand has had an influenza Pandemic action plan since 2006. Following this plan New Zealand immediately upgraded its influenza pandemic alert status to code yellow. The national stockpile of 1.4 million doses of oseltamivir was released to regional health authorities. The initial response as specified in the Pandemic Action Plan is a policy of border control and cluster control via voluntary quarantine and treatment of contacts with oseltamivir.

== See also ==
- Health care in New Zealand
- COVID-19 pandemic in New Zealand
