= Annette Beautrais =

New Zealand suicidologist

- Education: University of Otago
- Scientific career
- Fields: Suicidology
- Thesis: Serious suicide attempts in young people: a case control study (1996)

Annette Louise Beautrais is a New Zealand suicidologist. She is an adjunct professor at the University of Canterbury in Christchurch, where she formerly directed the Canterbury Suicide Project prior to leaving in 2009 because some of her grant applications for a research project and a suicide coordinator at Canterbury were rejected. Beautrais has a PhD from the University of Otago, completed in 1996. She is also affiliated with the University of Canterbury School of Health Sciences and is a senior research fellow at the University of Auckland's South Auckland Clinical School. She is also the World Health Organization's leader on suicide prevention strategy, and was the chair of two different symposia at the International Association for Suicide Prevention's 2015 conference in Montreal, Quebec, Canada. She is also one of two co-chairs of the International Association for Suicide Prevention's Emergency Medicine and Suicidal Behavior task force, and helped organise World Suicide Prevention Day events in 2009 around the world.
