= Tia Barrett =

New Zealand diplomat (1947–2009)

Te Rongotoa "Tia" Barrett previously known as John Richard Te Rongotoa Barrett (24 July 1947 – 15 November 2009) was a New Zealand diplomat of indigenous Ngati Maniapoto and Waikato extraction from the Tainui iwi. He was director of the Māori Policy Unit at the Ministry of Foreign Affairs and Trade (MFAT).

== Career background ==
Barrett joined the Foreign Ministry in 1973. He was High Commissioner to the Solomon Islands and Fiji, and had been posted to New Caledonia, France and Tonga. He spoke French fluently.

He was New Zealand's first Māori High Commissioner to Rarotonga. He was High Commissioner to the Cook Islands at the time of his sudden death in Middlemore Hospital in Auckland on 15 November 2009 following a short illness.

== Family ==
Tia Barrett grew up in Aria, Waikato. He is survived by his second wife, Theresa, and his two children, Caroline and Nicholas.

== List of honours ==
- Chevalier de la Légion d'honneur (France) – 2011.
