= Liz Duggan =

Liz Duggan retired as Archdeacon of Central Otago in 2015 having served since 2009.
