= John Bollard (judge) =

New Zealand judge (1940–2009)

Richard John Bollard (20 April 1940 – 27 April 2009) was New Zealand's principal Environment Court Judge from April 2003 until his death and had served on the Environment Court (earlier the Planning Tribunal) from April 1988 until his death in Auckland.

== Early life ==
Bollard was born on 20 April 1940 in Wellington.

== Background ==
Bollard established himself as a civil litigation lawyer and partner in the firm now known as Brookfields in the 1970s, obtaining an M Jur degree with distinction in the field of commercial law. In 1980 he began specialising in town planning and general administrative law matters, and during the early 1980s Bollard acted as counsel for the Manukau City Council, the University of Auckland, and the Auckland Regional Authority (as it then was), and for eight other authorities within the greater Auckland area and the Bay of Plenty. He appeared extensively before the Planning Tribunal, High Court and Court of Appeal, featuring in over twenty reported cases.

Bollard was also active in law society affairs, serving on numerous committees and sub-committees. He has authored many articles, particularly on the Court's function and progress, and has addressed seminars and working sessions staged by local government and professional bodies. He was a lead speaker at the Environment Session of the Xth Commonwealth Law Conference in 1993.

Bollard's judicial work involved various cases of notable public interest, including the first significant Resource Management Act 1991 offence trial and sentencing, known as the Machinery Movers case, the location of the Auckland Sky Tower, the One Tree Hill Maori activist prosecution, provision of night-game lighting at Eden Park, and adjudicating on many planning issues particularly in relation to Auckland's North Shore and the Bay of Plenty.
