= Optical chaos =

Chaos generated by laser instabilities

In the field of photonics, optical chaos is chaos generated by laser instabilities using different schemes in semiconductor and fiber lasers. Optical chaos is observed in many non-linear optical systems. One of the most common examples is an optical ring resonator.

== Optical computing ==
Optical chaos was a field of research in the mid-1980s and was aimed at the production of all-optical devices including all-optical computers. Researchers realised later the inherent limitation of the optical systems due to the nonlocalised nature of photons compared to highly localised nature of electrons.

== Communications ==
Research in optical chaos has seen a recent resurgence in the context of studying synchronization phenomena, and in developing techniques for secure optical communications.
