= List of IIHF Inline Hockey World Championship medalists =

The IIHF InLine Hockey World Championship is an annual event held by the International Ice Hockey Federation (IIHF). The first World Championship tournament was decided at the 1996 World Championship. As of 2017, 20 tournaments have been staged. No championship was held in 1999 or in 2016. Five nations have won a gold medal at the World Championships and a total of eight have won medals. The United States has won 7 golds and total 15 medals, the most of any nation.

== Medalists ==
Key

(#)	Number of tournaments won at the time.

Year	(gold) Gold	(silver) Silver	(bronze) Bronze	Host city (cities)	Host country
1996	United States (1)	Canada	Finland	Minneapolis and St. Paul	United States
1997	United States (2)	Canada	Switzerland	Anaheim	United States
1998	Canada (1)	United States	Finland	Anaheim	United States
1999	No tournament held				
2000	Finland (1)	Czech Republic	United States	Hradec Kralové and Choceň	Czech Republic
2001	Finland (2)	United States	Czech Republic	Ellenton	United States
2002	Sweden (1)	Finland	Germany	Nürnberg and Pfaffenhofen	Germany
2003	Finland (3)	Sweden	United States	Nürnberg and Amberg	Germany
2004	United States (3)	Finland	Sweden	Bad Tölz	Germany
2005	Sweden (2)	Finland	United States	Kuopio	Finland
2006	United States (4)	Sweden	Finland	Budapest	Hungary
2007	Sweden (3)	Finland	Germany	Landshut and Passau	Germany
2008	Sweden (4)	Slovakia	Germany	Bratislava	Slovakia
2009	Sweden (5)	United States	Germany	Ingolstadt	Germany
2010	United States (5)	Czech Republic	Sweden	Karlstad	Sweden
2011	Czech Republic (1)	United States	Canada	Pardubice	Czech Republic
2012	Canada (2)	Germany	Finland	Ingolstadt	Germany
2013	United States (6)	Sweden	Canada	Dresden	Germany
2014	Finland (4)	Canada	United States	Pardubice	Czech Republic
2015	Canada (3)	Finland	Sweden	Tampere	Finland
2016	No tournament held				
2017	United States (7)	Finland	Czech Republic	Bratislava	Slovakia

== Medal table ==
Countries in italics no longer compete at the World Championships.

Country	(gold) Gold	(silver) Silver	(bronze) Bronze	Medals
United States	7	4	4	15
Sweden	5	3	3	11
Finland	4	6	4	14
Canada	3	3	2	8
Czech Republic	1	2	2	5
Germany	0	1	4	5
Slovakia	0	1	0	1
Switzerland	0	0	1	1
