= 2003 IIHF InLine Hockey World Championship =

International sports tournament

Tournament details
- Host country: Germany
- Venue(s): 2 (in 2 host cities)
- Dates: July 2003
- Teams: 16

Final positions
- Champions: Finland
- Runner-up: Sweden
- Third place: United States

The 2003 IIHF InLine Hockey World Championship was the seventh IIHF InLine Hockey World Championship, the premier annual international inline hockey tournament. It took place in Nuremberg and Amberg, Germany, with the gold-medal game played on July 19, 2003.

== Championship ==
=== Preliminary round ===
==== Group A ====
| Pos | Team | Pld | W | OTW | OTL | L | GF | GA | GD | Pts | USA | CZE | SWE | AUT |
|---|---|---|---|---|---|---|---|---|---|---|---|---|---|---|
| 1 | United States | 3 | 2 | 1 | 0 | 0 | 24 | 10 | +14 | 8 | — | 6–5^{OT} | 3–2 | 15–3 |
| 2 | Czech Republic | 3 | 2 | 0 | 1 | 0 | 23 | 14 | +9 | 7 | | — | 7–6 | 11–2 |
| 3 | Sweden | 3 | 1 | 0 | 0 | 2 | 11 | 10 | +1 | 3 | | | — | 3–0 |
| 4 | Austria | 3 | 0 | 0 | 0 | 3 | 5 | 29 | −24 | 0 | | | | — |

==== Group B ====
| Pos | Team | Pld | W | OTW | OTL | L | GF | GA | GD | Pts | FIN | GER | SVK | SLO |
|---|---|---|---|---|---|---|---|---|---|---|---|---|---|---|
| 1 | Finland | 3 | 3 | 0 | 0 | 0 | 30 | 11 | +19 | 9 | — | 7–3 | 6–5 | 17–3 |
| 2 | Germany | 3 | 2 | 0 | 0 | 1 | 21 | 19 | +2 | 6 | | — | 8–5 | 10–7 |
| 3 | Slovakia | 3 | 1 | 0 | 0 | 2 | 18 | 21 | −3 | 3 | | | — | 8–7 |
| 4 | Slovenia | 3 | 0 | 0 | 0 | 3 | 17 | 35 | −18 | 0 | | | | — |

=== Playoff round ===
==== Qualifiers ====
| July 16, 2003 | Slovenia | 9 - 8 OT | Japan |

| July 16, 2003 | Austria | 8 - 6 | Brazil |

==== Quarterfinals ====
| July 17, 2003 | United States | 8 - 5 | Slovenia |

| July 17, 2003 | Finland | 26 - 2 | Austria |

| July 17, 2003 | Czech Republic | 13 - 3 | Slovakia |

| July 17, 2003 | Sweden | 9 - 5 | Germany |

==== Placement games ====
7th place game

| July 18, 2003 | Slovenia | 6 - 5 | Austria |

5th place game

| July 18, 2003 | Germany | 9 - 8 | Slovakia |

==== Semifinals ====
| July 18, 2003 | Sweden | 7 - 4 | United States |

| July 18, 2003 | Finland | 13 - 3 | Czech Republic |

==== Bronze medal game ====
| July 19, 2003 | United States | 11 - 6 | Czech Republic |

==== Gold medal game ====
| July 19, 2003 | Finland | 5 - 3 | Sweden |

== Division I ==
=== Preliminary round ===
==== Group C ====
| Pos | Team | Pld | W | OTW | OTL | L | GF | GA | GD | Pts | BRA | GBR | HUN | RSA |
|---|---|---|---|---|---|---|---|---|---|---|---|---|---|---|
| 1 | Brazil | 3 | 3 | 0 | 0 | 0 | 29 | 13 | +16 | 9 | — | 9–7 | 6–5 | 14–1 |
| 2 | Great Britain | 3 | 2 | 0 | 0 | 1 | 29 | 12 | +17 | 6 | | — | 6–2 | 16–1 |
| 3 | Hungary | 3 | 1 | 0 | 0 | 2 | 13 | 15 | −2 | 3 | | | — | 6–3 |
| 4 | South Africa | 3 | 0 | 0 | 0 | 3 | 5 | 36 | −31 | 0 | | | | — |

==== Group D ====
| Pos | Team | Pld | W | OTW | OTL | L | GF | GA | GD | Pts | JPN | NZL | AUS | ARG |
|---|---|---|---|---|---|---|---|---|---|---|---|---|---|---|
| 1 | Japan | 3 | 3 | 0 | 0 | 0 | 33 | 10 | +23 | 9 | — | 9–5 | 14–2 | 10–3 |
| 2 | New Zealand | 3 | 2 | 0 | 0 | 1 | 19 | 18 | +1 | 6 | | — | 6–5 | 8–4 |
| 3 | Australia | 3 | 1 | 0 | 0 | 2 | 13 | 21 | −8 | 3 | | | — | 6–1 |
| 4 | Argentina | 3 | 0 | 0 | 0 | 3 | 8 | 24 | −16 | 0 | | | | — |

=== Playoff round ===
==== Quarterfinals ====
| July 17, 2003 | Brazil | 5 - 3 | Argentina |

| July 17, 2003 | Japan | 15 - 3 | South Africa |

| July 17, 2003 | Australia | 9 - 4 | Great Britain |

| July 17, 2003 | Hungary | 9 - 4 | New Zealand |

==== Placement games ====
15th place game

| July 18, 2003 | South Africa | 4 - 3 | Argentina |

13th place game

| July 18, 2003 | Great Britain | 9 - 5 | New Zealand |

==== Semifinals ====
| July 18, 2003 | Brazil | 10 - 3 | Hungary |

| July 18, 2003 | Japan | 5 - 4 | Australia |

==== 3rd place game (11th overall) ====
| July 19, 2003 | Australia | 12 - 3 | Hungary |

==== Final (9th overall) ====
| July 19, 2003 | Japan | 11 - 6 | Brazil |
