= 2005 IIHF InLine Hockey World Championship =

International sports tournament

Tournament details
- Host country: Germany
- Venue(s): 1 (in 1 host city)
- Dates: July 2005
- Teams: 16

Final positions
- Champions: Sweden
- Runner-up: Finland
- Third place: United States

The 2005 IIHF InLine Hockey World Championship was the ninth IIHF InLine Hockey World Championship, the premier annual international inline hockey tournament. It took place in Kuopio, Finland, with the gold-medal game played on July 16, 2005.

== Championship ==
=== Preliminary round ===
==== Group A ====
| Pos | Team | Pld | W | OTW | OTL | L | GF | GA | GD | Pts | USA | GER | SVK | SLO |
|---|---|---|---|---|---|---|---|---|---|---|---|---|---|---|
| 1 | United States | 3 | 3 | 0 | 0 | 0 | 19 | 6 | +13 | 9 | — | 6–2 | 8–3 | 5–1 |
| 2 | Germany | 3 | 2 | 0 | 0 | 1 | 17 | 10 | +7 | 6 | | — | 8–1 | 7–3 |
| 3 | Slovakia | 3 | 1 | 0 | 0 | 2 | 14 | 20 | −6 | 3 | | | — | 10–4 |
| 4 | Slovenia | 3 | 0 | 0 | 0 | 3 | 8 | 22 | −14 | 0 | | | | — |

==== Group B ====
| Pos | Team | Pld | W | OTW | OTL | L | GF | GA | GD | Pts | FIN | SWE | CZE | AUT |
|---|---|---|---|---|---|---|---|---|---|---|---|---|---|---|
| 1 | Finland | 3 | 3 | 0 | 0 | 0 | 27 | 14 | +13 | 9 | — | 8–6 | 10–5 | 9–3 |
| 2 | Sweden | 3 | 2 | 0 | 0 | 1 | 30 | 13 | +17 | 6 | | — | 5–4 | 19–1 |
| 3 | Czech Republic | 3 | 1 | 0 | 0 | 2 | 31 | 18 | +13 | 3 | | | — | 22–3 |
| 4 | Austria | 3 | 0 | 0 | 0 | 3 | 7 | 50 | −43 | 0 | | | | — |

=== Playoff round ===
==== Qualifiers ====
| July 13, 2005 | Austria | 10 - 2 | Brazil |

| July 13, 2005 | Slovenia | 5 - 4 | Great Britain |

==== Quarterfinals ====
| July 14, 2005 | United States | 12 - 2 | Austria |

| July 14, 2005 | Finland | 7 - 6 OT | Slovenia |

| July 14, 2005 | Czech Republic | 10 - 9 OT | Germany |

| July 14, 2005 | Sweden | 15 - 1 | Slovakia |

==== Placement games ====
7th place game

| July 15, 2005 | Austria | W - L | Slovenia |

5th place game

| July 15, 2005 | Germany | 5 - 4 | Slovakia |

==== Semifinals ====
| July 15, 2005 | Finland | 4 - 1 | Czech Republic |

| July 15, 2005 | Sweden | 6 - 5 OT | United States |

==== Bronze medal game ====
| July 16, 2005 | United States | 6 - 0 | Czech Republic |

==== Gold medal game ====
| July 16, 2005 | Sweden | 3 - 1 | Finland |

== Division I ==
=== Preliminary round ===
==== Group C ====
| Pos | Team | Pld | W | OTW | OTL | L | GF | GA | GD | Pts | GBR | HUN | AUS | POR |
|---|---|---|---|---|---|---|---|---|---|---|---|---|---|---|
| 1 | Great Britain | 3 | 2 | 1 | 0 | 0 | 25 | 12 | +13 | 8 | — | 8–7^{OT} | 6–4 | 11–1 |
| 2 | Hungary | 3 | 2 | 0 | 1 | 0 | 31 | 18 | +13 | 7 | | — | 9–3 | 15–7 |
| 3 | Australia | 3 | 1 | 0 | 0 | 2 | 20 | 15 | +5 | 3 | | | — | 13–0 |
| 4 | Portugal | 3 | 0 | 0 | 0 | 3 | 8 | 39 | −31 | 0 | | | | — |

==== Group D ====
| Pos | Team | Pld | W | OTW | OTL | L | GF | GA | GD | Pts | BRA | JPN | NAM | TPE |
|---|---|---|---|---|---|---|---|---|---|---|---|---|---|---|
| 1 | Brazil | 3 | 3 | 0 | 0 | 0 | 26 | 6 | +20 | 9 | — | 4–3 | 7–3 | 15–0 |
| 2 | Japan | 3 | 2 | 0 | 0 | 1 | 19 | 10 | +9 | 6 | | — | 6–3 | 10–3 |
| 3 | Namibia | 3 | 1 | 0 | 0 | 2 | 14 | 20 | −6 | 3 | | | — | 8–7 |
| 4 | Chinese Taipei | 3 | 0 | 0 | 0 | 3 | 10 | 33 | −23 | 0 | | | | — |

=== Playoff round ===
==== Quarterfinals ====
| July 14, 2005 | Great Britain | W - L | Chinese Taipei |

| July 14, 2005 | Brazil | 9 - 4 | Portugal |

| July 14, 2005 | Hungary | 9 - 3 | Namibia |

| July 14, 2005 | Japan | 7 - 6 OT | Australia |

==== Placement games ====
15th place game

| July 15, 2003 | Portugal | 6 - 5 | Chinese Taipei |

13th place game

| July 15, 2005 | Australia | 6 - 5 | Namibia |

==== Semifinals ====
| July 15, 2005 | Great Britain | W - L | Japan |

| July 15, 2005 | Hungary | 5 - 4 | Brazil |

==== 3rd place game (11th overall) ====
| July 16, 2005 | Great Britain | 7 - 4 | Brazil |

==== Final (9th overall) ====
| July 16, 2005 | Hungary | 6 - 2 | Japan |
