= 1998 IIHF InLine Hockey World Championship =

International sports tournament

Tournament details
- Host country: United States
- Venue(s): 2 (in 1 host city)
- Dates: July 1998
- Teams: 8

Final positions
- Champions: Canada
- Runners-up: United States
- Third place: Finland

The 1998 IIHF InLine Hockey World Championship was the third IIHF InLine Hockey World Championship, the premier annual international inline hockey tournament. It took place at Anaheim, California, United States, with the gold-medal game played July 25, 1998, at the Arrowhead Pond.

== Group A ==
=== Preliminary round ===
Scores

July 20, 1998	United States	18 - 0	Italy

July 20, 1998	Canada	14 - 4	Austria

July 20, 1998	Germany	7 - 7	Switzerland

July 20, 1998	Finland	13 - 2	Russia

July 21, 1998	United States	9 - 5	Finland

July 21, 1998	Canada	13 - 6	Germany

July 21, 1998	Russia	12 - 6	Italy

July 21, 1998	Switzerland	11 - 3	Austria

July 22, 1998	United States	19 - 1	Russia

July 22, 1998	Canada	5 - 4	Switzerland

July 22, 1998	Germany	14 - 5	Austria

July 22, 1998	Finland	10 - 4	Italy

Group A standings

Team	Pld	W	L	D	GF	GA	GD	Pts
United States	3	3	0	0	46	6	+40	6
Finland	3	2	1	0	28	15	+13	4
Russia	3	1	2	0	15	38	−23	2
Italy	3	0	3	0	10	40	−30	0

Group B standings

Team	Pld	W	L	D	GF	GA	GD	Pts
Canada	3	3	0	0	32	14	+18	6
Switzerland	3	1	1	1	22	15	+7	3
Germany	3	1	1	1	27	25	+2	3
Austria	3	0	3	0	12	39	−27	0

=== Playoff round ===
==== Semifinals ====
July 24, 1998	United States	10 - 4	Switzerland

July 24, 1998	Canada	11 - 5	Finland

==== Gold medal game ====
July 25, 1998	Canada	6 - 2	United States

==== Bronze medal game ====
July 25, 1998	Finland	5 - 1	Switzerland

=== Consolation round ===
July 24, 1998	Austria	6 - 5	Russia

July 24, 1998	Germany	11 - 4	Italy

==== 5th place game ====
July 25, 1998	Germany	10 - 9	Austria

==== 7th place game ====
July 25, 1998	Italy	6 - 5	Russia

== Group B ==
The Group B tournament was played in Bratislava and Trnava, Slovakia, from July 14–19, 1998.

=== Preliminary round ===
Group A standings

Team	Pld	W	L	D	GF	GA	GD	Pts
Czech Republic	3	3	0	0	51	8	+43	6
Sweden	3	2	1	0	73	9	+64	4
Japan	3	1	2	0	11	42	−31	2
Argentina	3	0	3	0	4	80	−76	0

Group B standings

Team	Pld	W	L	D	GF	GA	GD	Pts
Slovakia	3	3	0	0	37	13	+24	6
Netherlands	3	2	1	0	31	11	+20	4
Australia	3	1	2	0	11	25	−14	2
Great Britain	3	0	3	0	9	39	−30	0

=== Playoff round ===
==== Semifinals ====
July 18, 1998	Czech Republic	10 - 5	Netherlands

July 18, 1998	Sweden	10 - 8	Slovakia

==== Gold medal game ====
July 19, 1998	Sweden	8 - 7	Czech Republic

==== Bronze medal game ====
July 19, 1998	Slovakia	9 - 7	Netherlands

=== Consolation round ===
July 18, 1998	Australia	9 - 4	Argentina

July 18, 1998	Japan	8 - 4	Great Britain

==== 5th place game ====
July 19, 1998	Japan	8 - 3	Australia

==== 7th place game ====
July 19, 1998	Argentina	10 - 8	Great Britain
