= 2000 IIHF InLine Hockey World Championship =

International sports tournament

Tournament details
- Host country: Czech Republic
- Venue(s): 2 (in 2 host cities)
- Dates: July 2000
- Teams: 14

Final positions
- Champions: Finland
- Runner-up: Czech Republic
- Third place: United States

The 2000 IIHF InLine Hockey World Championship was the fourth IIHF InLine Hockey World Championship, the premier annual international inline hockey tournament. It took place in Hradec Králové and Choceň, Czech Republic, with the gold-medal game played on July 15, 2000.

== Qualification ==
=== Group I ===
Played in Landvetter, Sweden

Scores

July 9, 1999	Netherlands	8 - 5	Belgium

July 9, 1999	Sweden	15 - 1	Denmark

July 10, 1999	Netherlands	8 - 2	Denmark

July 10, 1999	Sweden	17 - 0	Belgium

July 11, 1999	Denmark	8 - 2	Belgium

July 11, 1999	Sweden	15 - 4	Netherlands

Standings

Team	Pld	W	L	D	GF	GA	GD	Pts
Sweden	3	3	0	0	47	5	+42	6
Netherlands	3	2	1	0	20	22	−2	4
Denmark	3	1	2	0	11	25	−14	2
Belgium	3	0	3	0	7	33	−26	0

=== Group II ===
Played in Kapfenberg, Austria

Scores

August 6, 1999	Italy	14 - 0	Hungary

August 6, 1999	Austria	32 - 2	Yugoslavia

August 7, 1999	Hungary	8 - 3	Yugoslavia

August 7, 1999	Italy	4 - 4	Austria

August 8, 1999	Italy	32 - 0	Yugoslavia

August 8, 1999	Austria	9 - 4	Hungary

Standings

Team	Pld	W	L	D	GF	GA	GD	Pts
Italy	3	2	0	1	50	4	+46	5
Austria	3	2	0	1	44	10	+34	5
Hungary	3	1	2	0	12	26	−14	2
Yugoslavia	3	0	3	0	5	71	−66	0

Italy later withdrew from the World Championship, and was replaced by Hungary.

=== Group III ===
Played in Choceñ, Czech Republic

Scores

August 27, 1999	Slovakia	44 - 1	Romania

August 27, 1999	Czech Republic	34 - 0	Turkey

August 28, 1999	Czech Republic	47 - 0	Romania

August 28, 1999	Slovakia	42 - 0	Turkey

August 29, 1999	Turkey	9 - 1	Romania

August 29, 1999	Czech Republic	5 - 5	Slovakia

Standings

Team	Pld	W	L	D	GF	GA	GD	Pts
Slovakia	3	2	0	1	91	6	+85	5
Czech Republic	3	2	0	1	86	5	+81	5
Turkey	3	1	2	0	9	77	−68	2
Romania	3	0	3	0	2	100	−98	0

Originally, Ukraine was supposed to compete as well.

=== Southern Hemisphere Group ===
Played in Buenos Aires, Argentina

Scores

November 5, 1999	Brazil	16 - 0	Chile

November 5, 1999	Argentina	10 - 1	South Africa

November 6, 1999	Brazil	7 - 3	South Africa

November 6, 1999	Argentina	8 - 3	Chile

November 7, 1999	Chile	8 - 4	South Africa

November 7, 1999	Brazil	7 - 4	Argentina

Standings

Team	Pld	W	L	D	GF	GA	GD	Pts
Brazil	3	3	0	0	30	7	+23	6
Argentina	3	2	1	0	22	11	+11	4
Chile	3	1	2	0	11	28	−17	2
South Africa	3	0	3	0	8	25	−17	0

Namibia was originally supposed to take part in the tournament. Chile eventually qualified for the World Championship, replacing Canada (who withdrew due to lack of funding for the trip)

=== Asia-Oceania Group ===
Played in Melbourne, Australia

Scores

December 3, 1999	New Zealand	30 - 0	Chinese Taipei

December 4, 1999	Australia	47 - 0	Chinese Taipei

December 5, 1999	Australia	7 - 4	New Zealand

Standings

Team	Pld	W	L	D	GF	GA	GD	Pts
Australia	2	2	0	0	54	4	+50	4
New Zealand	2	1	1	0	34	7	+27	2
Chinese Taipei	2	0	2	0	0	77	−77	0

Originally, Japan was supposed to compete as well.

== Championship ==
=== Preliminary round ===
Group A standings

Pos	Team	Pld	W	D	L	GF	GA	GD	Pts
1	Finland	6	6	0	0	154	21	+133	12
2	Czech Republic	6	5	0	1	93	24	+69	10
3	Sweden	6	4	0	2	120	19	+101	8
4	Austria	6	3	0	3	72	43	+29	6
5	Brazil	6	2	0	4	24	96	−72	4
6	New Zealand	6	1	0	5	31	131	−100	2
7	Chile	6	0	0	6	4	164	−160	0

Group B standings

Pos	Team	Pld	W	D	L	GF	GA	GD	Pts
1	Germany	6	6	0	0	101	22	+79	12
2	United States	6	5	0	1	84	17	+67	10
3	Slovakia	6	4	0	2	68	19	+49	8
4	Netherlands	6	3	0	3	39	54	−15	6
5	Australia	6	1	1	4	38	51	−13	3
6	Hungary	6	1	1	4	23	63	−40	3
7	Argentina	6	0	0	6	8	135	−127	0

=== Playoff round ===
==== Placement games ====
13th place game

July 14, 2000	Argentina	8 - 5	Chile

11th place game

July 14, 2000	Hungary	5 - 4 OT	New Zealand

9th place game

July 14, 2000	Australia	6 - 4	Brazil

7th place game

July 14, 2000	Austria	17 - 7	Netherlands

5th place game

July 15, 2000	Slovakia	7 - 6	Sweden

==== Semifinals ====
July 14, 2000	Finland	9 - 4	United States

July 14, 2000	Czech Republic	9 - 5	Germany

==== Bronze medal game ====
July 15, 2000	United States	6 - 1	Germany

==== Gold medal game ====
July 15, 2000	Finland	7 - 3	Czech Republic
