= 2002 IIHF InLine Hockey World Championship =

International sports tournament

Tournament details
- Host country: Germany
- Venue(s): 2 (in 2 host cities)
- Dates: July 2002
- Teams: 16

Final positions
- Champions: Sweden
- Runner-up: Finland
- Third place: Germany

The 2002 IIHF InLine Hockey World Championship was the sixth IIHF InLine Hockey World Championship, the premier annual international inline hockey tournament. It took place in Nuremberg and Pfaffenhofen an der Ilm, Germany, with the gold-medal game played on July 27, 2002.

== Championship ==
=== Preliminary round ===
==== Group A ====
Pos	Team	Pld	W	OTW	OTL	L	GF	GA	GD	Pts	FIN	SLO	HUN	BRA
1	Finland	3	3	0	0	0	54	6	+48	9	—	14–2	16–2	24–2
2	Slovenia	3	2	0	0	1	21	17	+4	6		—	12–1	7–2
3	Hungary	3	1	0	0	2	11	34	−23	3			—	8–6
4	Brazil	3	0	0	0	3	10	39	−29	0				—

==== Group B ====
Pos	Team	Pld	W	OTW	OTL	L	GF	GA	GD	Pts	USA	AUT	GBR	NZL
1	United States	3	3	0	0	0	54	5	+49	9	—	8–2	19–0	27–2
2	Austria	3	2	0	0	1	33	10	+23	6		—	13–1	18–1
3	Great Britain	3	1	0	0	2	6	34	−28	3			—	5–2
4	New Zealand	3	0	0	0	3	5	50	−45	0				—

==== Group C ====
Pos	Team	Pld	W	OTW	OTL	L	GF	GA	GD	Pts	GER	CZE	ARG	BEL
1	Germany	3	3	0	0	0	75	8	+67	9	—	11–6	27–1	37–1
2	Czech Republic	3	2	0	0	1	57	19	+38	6		—	25–2	26–6
3	Argentina	3	1	0	0	2	11	59	−48	3			—	8–7
4	Belgium	3	0	0	0	3	14	71	−57	0				—

==== Group D ====
Pos	Team	Pld	W	OTW	OTL	L	GF	GA	GD	Pts	SWE	SVK	JPN	CHI
1	Sweden	3	3	0	0	0	79	4	+75	9	—	7–3	14–1	58–0
2	Slovakia	3	2	0	0	1	37	14	+23	6		—	9–5	25–2
3	Japan	3	1	0	0	2	28	26	+2	3			—	22–3
4	Chile	3	0	0	0	3	5	105	−100	0				—

=== Second round ===
Games against common opponents carried over from preliminary round

==== Group E ====
Pos	Team	Pld	W	OTW	OTL	L	GF	GA	GD	Pts	FIN	SWE	SVK	SLO
1	Finland	3	3	0	0	0	34	10	+24	9	—	12–3		8–5
2	Sweden	3	2	0	0	1	19	13	+6	6		—		
3	Slovakia	3	1	0	0	2	19	23	−4	3			—	
4	Slovenia	3	0	0	0	3	8	34	−26	0		2–7	4–13	—

==== Group F ====
Pos	Team	Pld	W	OTW	OTL	L	GF	GA	GD	Pts	GER	CZE	USA	AUT
1	Germany	3	3	0	0	0	32	13	+19	9	—		5–4	16–3
2	Czech Republic	3	2	0	0	1	21	18	+3	6		—	5–3	10–4
3	United States	3	1	0	0	2	15	12	+3	3			—	
4	Austria	3	0	0	0	3	9	34	−25	0				—

==== Group G ====
Pos	Team	Pld	W	OTW	OTL	L	GF	GA	GD	Pts	JPN	HUN	BRA	CHI
1	Japan	3	3	0	0	0	34	9	+25	9	—			
2	Hungary	3	2	0	0	1	26	11	+15	6	2–3	—		16–2
3	Brazil	3	1	0	0	2	18	20	−2	3	4–9		—	8–3
4	Chile	3	0	0	0	3	8	46	−38	0				—

==== Group H ====
Pos	Team	Pld	W	OTW	OTL	L	GF	GA	GD	Pts	GBR	NZL	ARG	BEL
1	Great Britain	3	3	0	0	0	17	11	+6	9	—		5–4	7–5
2	New Zealand	3	2	0	0	1	29	15	+14	6		—	13–4	14–6
3	Argentina	3	1	0	0	2	16	25	−9	3			—	
4	Belgium	3	0	0	0	3	18	29	−11	0				—

=== Playoff round ===
==== Placement games ====
15th place game

July 26, 2002	Belgium	13 - 4	Chile

13th place game

July 26, 2002	Brazil	16 - 2	Argentina

9th-12th place qualifiers

July 26, 2002	Japan	10 - 3	New Zealand

July 26, 2002	Hungary	8 - 3	Great Britain

11th place game

July 27, 2002	New Zealand	9 - 7	Great Britain

9th place game

July 27, 2002	Hungary	9 - 6	Japan

7th place game

July 26, 2002	Slovenia	7 - 4	Austria

5th place game

July 26, 2002	United States	8 - 6	Slovakia

==== Semifinals ====
July 26, 2002	Finland	6 - 3	Czech Republic

July 26, 2002	Sweden	6 - 1	Germany

==== Bronze medal game ====
July 27, 2002	Germany	9 - 6	Czech Republic

==== Gold medal game ====
July 27, 2002	Sweden	6 - 5 OT	Finland
