= 2001 IIHF InLine Hockey World Championship =

International sports tournament

Tournament details
- Host country: United States
- Venue(s): 1 (in 1 host city)
- Dates: July 2001
- Teams: 12

Final positions
- Champions: Finland
- Runner-up: United States
- Third place: Czech Republic

The 2001 IIHF InLine Hockey World Championship was the fifth IIHF InLine Hockey World Championship, the premier annual international inline hockey tournament. It took place in Ellenton, Florida, United States, with the gold-medal game played on July 22, 2001.

== Championship ==
=== Preliminary round ===
==== Group A ====
Pos	Team	Pld	W	D	L	GF	GA	GD	Pts	USA	CZE	SWE	AUT	HUN	NZL
1	United States	5	5	0	0	81	13	+68	10	—	12–7	8–4	9–1	18–0	34–1
2	Czech Republic	5	4	0	1	57	21	+36	8		—	3–2	9–6	15–0	23–1
3	Sweden	5	3	0	2	79	14	+65	6			—	24–2	15–0	34–1
4	Austria	5	2	0	3	32	51	−19	4				—	15–5	7–1
5	Hungary	5	1	0	4	11	57	−46	2					—	7–1
6	New Zealand	5	0	0	5	9	113	−104	0						—

==== Group B ====
Pos	Team	Pld	W	D	L	GF	GA	GD	Pts	FIN	SVK	GER	BRA	AUS	ARG
1	Finland	5	5	0	0	138	14	+124	10	—	12–4	19–4	28–4	39–2	40–0
2	Slovakia	5	4	0	1	66	28	+38	8		—	8–5	10–3	17–8	27–0
3	Germany	5	3	0	2	75	34	+41	6			—	21–1	25–3	20–3
4	Brazil	5	2	0	3	24	72	−48	4				—	8–7	8–6
5	Australia	5	1	0	4	25	93	−68	2					—	5–4
6	Argentina	5	0	0	5	13	100	−87	0						—

=== Playoff round ===
==== Placement games ====
11th place game

July 21, 2001	New Zealand	9 - 4	Argentina

9th place game

July 21, 2001	Hungary	3 - 2 SO	Australia

7th place game

July 21, 2001	Austria	12 - 2	Brazil

5th place game

July 21, 2001	Sweden	9 - 6	Germany

==== Semifinals ====
July 21, 2001	Finland	18 - 1	Czech Republic

July 21, 2001	United States	9 - 3	Slovakia

==== Bronze medal game ====
July 22, 2001	Czech Republic	8 - 7	Slovakia

==== Gold medal game ====
July 22, 2001	Finland	12 - 6	United States
