= 2013 IIHF Inline Hockey World Championship =

International sports tournament

Tournament details
- Host country: Germany
- Venue: 1 (in 1 host city)
- Dates: 2 June – 8 June
- Teams: 8

Final positions
- Champions: United States (6th title)
- Runners-up: Sweden
- Third place: Canada

Tournament statistics
- Games played: 23
- Goals scored: 239 (10.39 per game)
- Attendance: 7,040 (306 per game)
- Scoring leader: (United States) Travis Noe

The 2013 IIHF Inline Hockey World Championship was the 18th IIHF Inline Hockey World Championship, an international inline hockey tournament run by the International Ice Hockey Federation. The World Championship ran alongside the 2013 IIHF Inline Hockey World Championship Division I tournament and took place between 2 and 8 June 2013 in Dresden, Germany. The tournament was won by the United States, earning their sixth World Championship title. Sweden finished in second place and Canada in third after defeating Slovakia in the bronze medal match. Slovenia after losing their placement round game and finishing last in the standings was relegated to Division I for 2014.

== Qualification ==
Seven of the eight teams automatically qualified for the 2013 IIHF Inline Hockey World Championship while the eighth spot was awarded to the winner of the 2012 IIHF InLine Hockey World Championship Division I tournament. The 2012 Division I tournament was won by Slovakia who defeated Hungary in the final to earn promotion back to the World Championship after they were relegated in 2011.

- Canada − Finished first in the 2012 World Championship
- Czech Republic − Finished sixth in the 2012 World Championship
- Finland − Finished third in the 2012 World Championship
- Germany − Finished second in the 2012 World Championship
- Slovenia − Finished fourth in the 2012 World Championship
- Slovakia − Winner of 2012 IIHF InLine Hockey World Championship Division I
- Sweden − Finished seventh in the 2012 World Championship
- United States − Finished fifth in the 2012 World Championship

== Seeding and groups ==
The seeding in the preliminary round was based on the final standings at the 2012 IIHF InLine Hockey World Championship and 2012 IIHF InLine Hockey World Championship Division I. The World Championships groups are named Group A and Group B while the 2013 IIHF Inline Hockey World Championship Division I tournament use Group C and Group D, as both tournaments were held in Dresden, Germany. The teams were grouped accordingly by seeding at the previous year's tournament (in parentheses is the corresponding seeding):

Group C

- Canada (1)
- Slovenia (4)
- United States (5)
- Slovakia (8)

Group D

- Germany (2)
- Finland (3)
- Czech Republic (6)
- Sweden (7)

== Preliminary round ==
Eight participating teams were placed in the following two groups. After playing a round-robin, every team advanced to the Playoff round.

All times are local (UTC+2).

=== Group A ===
Team	Pld	W	OTW	OTL	L	GF	GA	GD	Pts
United States	3	3	0	0	0	22	7	+15	9
Canada	3	2	0	0	1	19	9	+10	6
Slovenia	3	0	1	0	2	10	26	−16	2
Slovakia	3	0	0	1	2	5	14	−9	1

2 June 2013; 14:00	Slovenia	3 – 13 (1–4, 0–2, 1–4, 1–3)	United States	Dresden Arena; Attendance: 550

Game reference

2 June 2013; 20:00	Slovakia	1 – 6 (0–1, 0–3, 1–0, 0–2)	Canada	Dresden Arena; Attendance: 190

Game reference

3 June 2013; 14:00	Slovenia	4 – 3 (OT) (0–1, 2–1, 1–0, 0–1, 1–0)	Slovakia	Dresden Arena; Attendance: 110

Game reference

3 June 2013; 18:00	Canada	3 – 5 (0–1, 1–1, 1–1, 1–2)	United States	Dresden Arena; Attendance: 275

Game reference

4 June 2013; 14:00	United States	4 – 1 (1–0, 2–0, 0–1, 1–0)	Slovakia	Dresden Arena; Attendance: 75

Game reference

4 June 2013; 18:00	Canada	10 – 3 (3–2, 3–0, 1–1, 3–0)	Slovenia	Dresden Arena

Game reference

=== Group B ===
Team	Pld	W	OTW	OTL	L	GF	GA	GD	Pts
Finland	3	2	1	0	0	20	12	+8	8
Sweden	3	2	0	0	1	22	11	+11	6
Czech Republic	3	1	0	1	1	12	17	−5	4
Germany	3	0	0	0	3	6	20	−14	0

2 June 2013; 16:00	Finland	5 – 4 (OT) (0–0, 0–3, 3–0, 1–1, 1–0)	Czech Republic	Dresden Arena; Attendance: 785

Game reference

2 June 2013; 18:00	Sweden	7 – 1 (0–0, 4–0, 1–0, 2–1)	Germany	Dresden Arena; Attendance: 1420

Game reference

3 June 2013; 16:00	Finland	7 – 4 (2–1, 3–1, 1–2, 1–0)	Sweden	Dresden Arena; Attendance: 200

Game reference

3 June 2013; 20:00	Germany	1 – 5 (0–2, 0–1, 1–2, 0–0)	Czech Republic	Dresden Arena; Attendance: 350

Game reference

4 June 2013; 16:00	Czech Republic	3 – 11 (2–6, 1–1, 0–2, 0–2)	Sweden	Dresden Arena; Attendance: 90

Game reference

4 June 2013; 20:00	Germany	4 – 8 (0–3, 1–2, 1–0, 2–3)	Finland	Dresden Arena; Attendance: 220

Game reference

== Playoff round ==
All eight teams advanced into the playoff round and were seeded into the quarterfinals according to their result in the preliminary round. The winning quarterfinalists advanced through to the semifinals, while the losing teams moved through to the placement round. Slovenia was relegated after losing the final placement round game against Finland, while the Czech Republic finished fifth after defeating Slovenia and Germany finished sixth following their win over Finland. In the semifinals Sweden defeated Canada and the United States beat Slovakia, both advancing to the gold medal game. After losing the semifinals Canada and Slovakia played off for the bronze medal with Canada winning 5–1. The United States defeated Sweden 6–3 in the gold medal game, earning their sixth World Championship title.

Quarterfinals
B2	Sweden	12
A3	Slovenia	3
A2	Canada	8
B3	Czech Republic	5
A1	United States	7
B4	Germany	4
B1	Finland	3
A4	Slovakia	4

Semifinals
QF1	Sweden	10
QF2	Canada	5
QF3	United States	11
QF4	Slovakia	4

Finals
SF1	Sweden	3
SF2	United States	6
Bronze medal game
SF1	Canada	5
SF2	Slovakia	1

All times are local (UTC+2).

=== Quarterfinals ===
6 June 2013; 14:00	Canada	8 – 5 (2–5, 3–0, 2–0, 1–0)	Czech Republic	Dresden Arena; Attendance: 130

Game reference

6 June 2013; 16:00	Sweden	12 – 3 (3–1, 4–1, 4–1, 1–0)	Slovenia	Dresden Arena; Attendance: 150

Game reference

6 June 2013; 18:00	Finland	3 – 4 (1–0, 0–1, 1–1, 1–2)	Slovakia	Dresden Arena; Attendance: 210

Game reference

6 June 2013; 20:00	United States	7 – 4 (3–1, 0–2, 2–0, 2–1)	Germany	Dresden Arena; Attendance: 335

Game reference

=== Placement round ===
7 June 2013; 14:00	Czech Republic	7 – 2 (1–0, 2–0, 1–1, 3–1)	Slovenia	Dresden Arena

Game reference

7 June 2013; 20:00	Finland	5 – 7 (0–1, 1–2, 1–3, 3–1)	Germany	Dresden Arena; Attendance: 230

Game reference

==== Relegation game ====
8 June 2013; 11:00	Finland	8 – 3 (0–0, 2–2, 3–0, 3–1)	Slovenia	Dresden Arena; Attendance: 35

Game reference

=== Semifinals ===
7 June 2013; 16:00	Sweden	10 – 5 (2–0, 2–2, 0–3, 6–0)	Canada	Dresden Arena; Attendance: 120

Game reference

7 June 2013; 18:00	United States	11 – 4 (4–0, 4–1, 0–3, 3–0)	Slovakia	Dresden Arena; Attendance: 160

Game reference

=== Bronze medal game ===
8 June 2013; 16:30	Canada	5 – 1 (0–0, 2–0, 2–0, 1–1)	Slovakia	Dresden Arena; Attendance: 570

Game reference

=== Gold medal game ===
8 June 2013; 19:00	United States	6 – 3 (1–1, 0–1, 2–0, 3–1)	Sweden	Dresden Arena; Attendance: 835

Game reference

== Ranking and statistics ==
2013 IIHF InLine Hockey World Championship winners

United States
6th title

=== Tournament Awards ===
- Best players selected by the directorate:
  - Best Goalkeeper: (Canada) Brett Leggat
  - Best Defenseman: (Sweden) Daniel Brolin
  - Best Forward: (United States) Travis Noe

=== Final standings ===
The final standings of the tournament according to IIHF:

Rk.	Team
1st place, gold medalist(s)	United States
2nd place, silver medalist(s)	Sweden
3rd place, bronze medalist(s)	Canada
4.	Slovakia
5.	Czech Republic
6.	Germany
7.	Finland
8.	Slovenia

=== Scoring leaders ===
List shows the top skaters sorted by points, then goals. If the list exceeds 10 skaters because of a tie in points, all of the tied skaters are shown.

Player	GP	G	A	Pts	+/-	PIM	POS
(United States) Travis Noe	6	11	9	20	+10	1.5	F
(Sweden) Marcus Nilsson	6	6	14	20	+14	3.0	F
(Sweden) Daniel Brolin	6	4	16	20	+15	6.0	D
(Sweden) Henrik Hoglund	6	13	5	18	+13	3.0	F
(Sweden) Kristian Luukkonen	6	7	11	18	+12	7.5	F
(Canada) Thomas Woods	6	7	9	16	+8	1.5	F
(Canada) Chris Terry	6	9	6	15	+7	19.0	F
(United States) Matt White	6	9	4	13	+9	1.5	F
(Canada) Adam Ross	6	5	8	13	+2	4.5	D
(Canada) Max Grassi	6	4	9	13	+1	4.5	F
(Sweden) Dick Axelsson	6	3	10	13	+7	14.5	F

=== Leading goaltenders ===
Only the top five goaltenders, based on save percentage, who have played at least 40% of their team's minutes are included in this list.

Player	MIP	SOG	GA	GAA	SVS%	SO
(United States) Jerry Kuhn Ill	192:00	93	11	2.06	88.17	0
(Canada) Brett Leggat	279:11	177	24	3.09	86.44	0
(Finland) Jahu Taponen	205:09	105	15	2.63	85.71	0
(Sweden) Dennis Karlsson	120:00	66	10	3.00	84.85	0
(Slovakia) Vladimir Neumann	144:00	105	16	4.00	84.76	0
