= 2012 IIHF InLine Hockey World Championship =

International sports tournament

Tournament details
- Host country: Germany
- Venue(s): 1 (in 1 host city)
- Dates: 1–7 June
- Teams: 8

Final positions
- Champions: Canada (2nd title)
- Runner-up: Germany
- Third place: Finland
- Fourth place: Slovenia

Tournament statistics
- Games played: 23

The 2012 IIHF InLine Hockey World Championship was the 17th IIHF InLine Hockey World Championship, an international inline hockey tournament run by the International Ice Hockey Federation. The World Championship ran alongside the 2012 IIHF InLine Hockey World Championship Division I tournament and took place between 1 and 7 July in Ingolstadt, Germany. The tournament was won by Canada, earning their second World Championship title. Germany finished in second place and Finland third after defeating Slovenia in the bronze medal match. Great Britain were relegated to Division I for 2013 after losing the relegation game against Sweden.

== Qualification ==
Seven of the eight teams automatically qualified for the 2012 IIHF Inline Hockey World Championship while the eighth spot was awarded to the winner of the 2011 IIHF InLine Hockey World Championship Division I tournament. The 2011 Division I tournament was won by Great Britain who defeated Hungary 3–2 in the final.

- Canada − Finished third in the 2011 World Championship
- Czech Republic − Finished first in the 2011 World Championship
- Finland − Finished fifth in the 2011 World Championship
- Great Britain − Winner of 2011 IIHF InLine Hockey World Championship Division I
- Germany − Finished seventh in the 2011 World Championship
- Slovenia − Finished sixth in the 2011 World Championship
- Sweden − Finished fourth in the 2011 World Championship
- United States − Finished second in the 2011 World Championship

== Seeding and groups ==
The seeding in the preliminary round was based on the final standings at the 2011 IIHF InLine Hockey World Championship and 2011 IIHF InLine Hockey World Championship Division I. The World Championships groups are named Group A and Group B while the 2012 IIHF InLine Hockey World Championship Division I tournament use Group C and Group D, as both tournaments were held in Ingolstadt, Germany. The teams were grouped accordingly by seeding at the previous year's tournament (in parentheses is the corresponding seeding):

Group A

- Czech Republic (1)
- Sweden (4)
- Finland (5)
- Great Britain (8)

Group B

- United States (2)
- Canada (3)
- Slovenia (6)
- Germany (7)

== Preliminary round ==
Eight participating teams were placed in the following two groups. After playing a round-robin, every team advanced to the Playoff round.

All times are local (UTC+2).

=== Group A ===
Team	Pld	W	OTW	OTL	L	GF	GA	GD	Pts
Sweden	3	2	0	0	1	22	13	+9	6
Czech Republic	3	1	1	0	1	16	16	0	5
Great Britain	3	1	0	1	1	9	19	−10	4
Finland	3	1	0	0	2	12	11	+1	3

1 June 2012; 14:00	Sweden	5–3	Finland	Saturn Arena, Ingolstadt

1 June 2012; 18:00	Great Britain	4–5 OT	Czech Republic	Saturn Arena, Ingolstadt

2 June 2012; 14:00	Sweden	13–3	Great Britain	Saturn Arena, Ingolstadt

2 June 2012; 18:00	Czech Republic	4–8	Finland	Saturn Arena, Ingolstadt

3 June 2012; 14:00	Finland	1–2	Great Britain	Saturn Arena, Ingolstadt

3 June 2012; 18:00	Czech Republic	7–4	Sweden	Saturn Arena, Ingolstadt

=== Group B ===
Team	Pld	W	OTW	OTL	L	GF	GA	GD	Pts
United States	3	3	0	0	0	14	10	+4	9
Canada	3	1	0	1	1	10	12	−2	4
Germany	3	1	0	0	2	14	14	0	3
Slovenia	3	0	1	0	2	14	16	−2	2

1 June 2012; 16:00	Canada	4–5 OT	Slovenia	Saturn Arena, Ingolstadt

1 June 2012; 20:00	Germany	4–5	United States	Saturn Arena, Ingolstadt

2 June 2012; 16:00	Canada	4–3	Germany	Saturn Arena, Ingolstadt

2 June 2012; 20:00	United States	5–4	Slovenia	Saturn Arena, Ingolstadt

3 June 2012; 16:00	Slovenia	5–7	Germany	Saturn Arena, Ingolstadt

3 June 2012; 20:00	United States	4–2	Canada	Saturn Arena, Ingolstadt

== Playoff round ==
All eight teams advanced into the playoff round and were seeded into the quarterfinals according to their result in the preliminary round. The winning quarterfinalists advanced through to the semifinals, while the losing teams moved through to the placement round. Great Britain was relegated after losing the final placement round game against Sweden, while the United States and Czech Republic finished fifth and sixth respectively after their wins in the placement round. In the semifinals Canada defeated Slovenia and Germany beat Finland, both advancing to the gold medal game. After losing the semifinals Slovenia and Finland played off for the bronze medal with Finland winning 9–4. Canada defeated Germany 9–5 in the gold medal game, earning their second World Championship title.

Quarterfinals
B2	Canada	9
A3	Great Britain	3
A1	Sweden	3
B4	Slovenia	4
A2	Czech Republic	5
B3	Germany	6
A4	Finland	5
B1	United States	4

Semifinals
QF1	Canada	5
QF2	Slovenia	3
QF3	Germany	3
QF4	Finland	2

Finals
SF1	Canada	9
SF2	Germany	5
Bronze medal game
SF1	Slovenia	4
SF2	Finland	9

=== Quarterfinals ===
All times are local (UTC+2).

5 June 2012; 14:00	Canada	9–3	Great Britain	Saturn Arena, Ingolstadt

5 June 2012; 16:00	Sweden	3–4 OT	Slovenia	Saturn Arena, Ingolstadt

5 June 2012; 18:00	United States	4–5	Finland	Saturn Arena, Ingolstadt

5 June 2012; 20:00	Czech Republic	5–6 GWS	Germany	Saturn Arena, Ingolstadt

=== Placement round ===
6 June 2012; 14:00	Sweden	4–5 GWS	Czech Republic	Saturn Arena, Ingolstadt

6 June 2012; 16:00	United States	18–1	Great Britain	Saturn Arena, Ingolstadt

=== Semifinals ===
6 June 2012; 18:00	Canada	5–3	Slovenia	Saturn Arena, Ingolstadt

6 June 2012; 20:00	Germany	3–2	Finland	Saturn Arena, Ingolstadt

=== Relegation round ===
7 June 2012; 10:00	Sweden	7–2	Great Britain	Saturn Arena, Ingolstadt

=== Bronze medal game ===
7 June 2012; 16:00	Finland	9–4	Slovenia	Saturn Arena, Ingolstadt

=== Gold medal game ===
7 June 2012; 18:00	Canada	9–5	Germany	Saturn Arena, Ingolstadt

== See also ==
- 2012 IIHF InLine Hockey World Championship Division I
