= 2004 IIHF Men's InLine Hockey World Championship =

International sports tournament

Tournament details
- Host country: Germany
- Venue: 1 (in 1 host city)
- Dates: 10–17 July 2004
- Teams: 16

Final positions
- Champions: United States (4th title)
- Runners-up: Finland
- Third place: Sweden

Tournament statistics
- Scoring leader: (United States) Ernie Hartlieb (19 points)

The 2004 Men's World Ice Hockey Championships was the ninth such event hosted by the International Ice Hockey Federation. It took place between July 10 and July 17, 2004.

== Tournament Format ==
The preliminary round will be played in four groups (A-D) with 4 teams each. The groups A and B form the Top Division, the groups C and D form Division I. The two last-placed teams of the groups A and B and the two first-placed teams of the groups C and D play for fourth place in group A and B to participate in the Top Division playoffs. The losers of those games play as first placed teams in group C and D to participate in the Division I playoffs. Playoffs starting with the quarterfinals and placement games will be played both in the Top Division and in Division I.

All games in the preliminary round and in the playoffs will be played with 5-minute sudden-death overtime and a penalty shootout in case of a tie. The final games will be played with a 12- minute sudden-death overtime, followed by a penalty shootout competition in case of a tie.

Teams will be awarded points on the following system:

- Win after regular time = 3 points
- Win after overtime or shootout = 2 points
- Loss after overtime or shootout = 1 point
- Loss after regular time = 0 points

== Participating teams ==
Groups are based on the results of the previous World Championships and Qualifying Series

Group A - Top Division

- Finland
- Czech Republic
- Germany
- Austria

Group B - Top Division

- Sweden
- United States
- Slovenia
- Slovakia

Group C - Division I

- Japan
- Hungary
- Great Britain
- Belgium

Group D - Division I

- Brazil
- Australia
- New Zealand
- Argentina

== Top Division ==
=== Preliminary round ===
==== Group A ====
Team	Pld	W	OTW	OTL	L	GF	GA	GD	Pts
Finland	3	3	0	0	0	24	10	+14	9
Germany	3	1	0	0	2	14	14	0	3
Czech Republic	3	1	0	0	2	13	19	−6	3
Austria	3	1	0	0	2	8	16	−8	3

Group loser sent to compete in qualification round

July 10, 2004; 19:00	Germany	3 - 5	Finland	Bad Tölz, Germany

July 11, 2004; 18:00	Germany	6 - 7	Czech Republic	Bad Tölz, Germany

July 11, 2004; 20:00	Finland	9 - 3	Austria	Bad Tölz, Germany

July 12, 2004; 16:00	Czech Republic	2 - 3	Austria	Bad Tölz, Germany

July 13, 2004; 18:00	Finland	10 - 4	Czech Republic	Bad Tölz, Germany

July 13, 2004; 20:00	Austria	2 - 5	Germany	Bad Tölz, Germany

==== Group B ====
Team	Pld	W	OTW	OTL	L	GF	GA	GD	Pts
United States	3	2	1	0	0	18	10	+8	8
Sweden	3	2	0	1	0	26	8	+18	7
Slovakia	3	0	1	0	2	9	20	−11	2
Slovenia	3	0	0	1	2	9	24	−15	1

Group loser sent to compete in qualification round

July 11, 2004	United States	7 - 3	Slovakia	Bad Tölz, Germany

July 11, 2004	Sweden	13 - 2	Slovenia	Bad Tölz, Germany

July 12, 2004	United States	6 - 3	Slovenia	Bad Tölz, Germany

July 12, 2004	Slovakia	1 - 9	Sweden	Bad Tölz, Germany

July 13, 2004	Slovenia	5 - 6 (OT)	Slovakia	Bad Tölz, Germany

July 13, 2004	Sweden	4 - 5 (OT)	United States	Bad Tölz, Germany

=== Qualifying round ===
July 14, 2004	Slovenia	15 - 0	Brazil	Bad Tölz, Germany

July 13, 2004	Austria	11 - 4	Great Britain	Bad Tölz, Germany

=== Play-off round ===
==== Draw ====
Quarterfinals
A3	Czech Republic	7
B2	Sweden	9
QRW1	Slovenia	2
A1	Finland	9
B3	Slovakia	3
A2	Germany	6
QRW2	Austria	5
B1	United States	6

Semifinals
QF1	Sweden	2
QF2	Finland	5
QF3	Germany	2
QF4	United States	5

Finals
SF2	Finland	5
SF1	United States	9
Bronze-medal game
SF1	Sweden	3
SF2	Germany	2

==== Quarter-finals ====
July 15, 2004	Sweden	9 - 7	Czech Republic

July 15, 2004	United States	6 - 5 (OT)	Austria

July 15, 2004	Germany	6 - 3	Slovakia

July 15, 2004	Finland	9 - 2	Slovenia

==== Semi-finals ====
July 16, 2004	United States	5 - 2	Germany

July 16, 2004	Finland	5 - 2	Sweden

==== 5th-place game ====
July 16, 2004 v	Slovakia	4 - 3 (OT)	Czech Republic

==== 7th-place game ====
July 16, 2004 v	Slovenia	3 - 4 (OT)	Austria

==== Bronze-medal game ====
July 17, 2004 v	Sweden	3 - 2 (OT)	Germany

==== Gold-medal game ====
July 17, 2004 v	Finland	5 - 9	United States

=== Ranking and statistics ===
==== Final standings ====
The final standings of the tournament according to IIHF:

Rk.	Team
1st place, gold medalist(s)	United States
2nd place, silver medalist(s)	Finland
3rd place, bronze medalist(s)	Sweden
4.	Germany
5.	Slovakia
6.	Czech Republic
7.	Austria
8.	Slovenia

==== Tournament awards ====
- Best players selected by the directorate:
  - Best Goalkeeper: Ari Luostarinen (Finland)
  - Best Defenseman: Ernie Hartlieb (United States)
  - Best Forward: Dejan Matejic (Sweden)

== Division I ==
=== Qualification ===
==== European Zone ====
Played in Loverval, Belgium

Team	Pld	W	OTW	OTL	L	GF	GA	GD	Pts
Belgium	2	2	0	0	0	26	5	+21	4
Liechtenstein	2	1	0	0	1	18	11	+7	2
Portugal	2	0	0	0	2	3	31	−28	0

February 20, 2004	Belgium	8 - 5	Liechtenstein

February 21, 2004	Belgium	18 - 0	Portugal

February 22, 2004	Liechtenstein	13 - 3	Portugal

==== Southern Hemisphere Zone ====
Played in South Africa

Team	Pld	W	OTW	OTL	L	GF	GA	GD	Pts
Argentina	2	2	0	0	0	15	1	+14	4
South Africa	2	1	0	0	1	5	10	−5	2
Namibia	2	0	0	0	2	3	12	−9	0

February 20, 2004	Argentina	7 - 1	Namibia

February 21, 2004	South Africa	5 - 2	Namibia

February 22, 2004	Argentina	8 - 0	South Africa

==== Asian Zone ====
Played in Taiwan

February 20, 2004	Chinese Taipei	18 - 2	Hong Kong

February 21, 2004	Chinese Taipei	12 - 1	Hong Kong

==== European-Asian Final ====
Played in Bad Tölz, Germany

July 10, 2004	Belgium	10 - 7	Chinese Taipei

=== Preliminary round ===
==== Group C ====
Team	Pld	W	OTW	OTL	L	GF	GA	GD	Pts
Great Britain	3	3	0	0	0	31	8	+23	9
Hungary	3	2	0	0	1	16	16	0	6
Japan	3	1	0	0	2	23	14	+9	3
Belgium	3	0	0	0	3	8	40	−32	0

Group Winner sent to compete in qualification round

July 11, 2004	Hungary	3 - 9	Great Britain	Bad Tölz, Germany

July 11, 2004	Japan	16 - 3	Belgium	Bad Tölz, Germany

July 12, 2004	Hungary	9 - 4	Belgium	Bad Tölz, Germany

July 12, 2004	Great Britain	7 - 4	Japan	Bad Tölz, Germany

July 13, 2004	Japan	3 - 4	Hungary	Bad Tölz, Germany

July 13, 2004; 20:00	Belgium	1 - 15	Great Britain	Bad Tölz, Germany

==== Group B ====
Team	Pld	W	OTW	OTL	L	GF	GA	GD	Pts
Brazil	3	3	0	0	0	17	8	+9	9
Australia	3	2	0	0	1	21	15	+6	6
New Zealand	3	1	0	0	2	21	15	+6	3
Argentina	3	0	0	0	3	5	26	−21	0

Group winner sent to compete in qualification round

July 11, 2004	Australia	7 - 6	New Zealand	Bad Tölz, Germany

July 11, 2004	Brazil	5 - 0	Argentina	Bad Tölz, Germany

July 12, 2004	Australia	11 - 4	Argentina	Bad Tölz, Germany

July 12, 2004	New Zealand	5 - 7	Brazil	Bad Tölz, Germany

July 13, 2004	Argentina	1 - 10	New Zealand	Bad Tölz, Germany

July 13, 2004; 20:00	Brazil	5 - 3	Australia	Bad Tölz, Germany

=== Play-off round ===
==== Draw ====
Quarterfinals
C3	Japan	10
D2	Australia	2
D4	Argentina	3
C1	Great Britain	8
D3	New Zealand	0
C2	Hungary	'10
C4	Belgium	3
D1	Brazil	8

Semifinals
QF1	Japan	5
QF2	Great Britain	8
QF3	Hungary	4
QF4	Brazil	5

Finals
SF2	Great Britain	5
SF1	Brazil	4
Bronze-medal game
SF1	Japan	7
SF2	Hungary	5

==== Quarter-finals ====
July 15, 2004	Australia	2 - 10	Japan

July 15, 2004	Hungary	10 - 0	New Zealand

July 15, 2004	Brazil	8 - 3	Belgium

July 15, 2004	Great Britain	8 - 3	Argentina

==== Semi-finals ====
July 16, 2004	Brazil	5 - 4 (OT)	Hungary

July 16, 2004	Great Britain	8 - 5	Japan

==== 5th-place game ====
July 16, 2004 v	Australia	9 - 3	New Zealand

==== 7th-place game ====
July 16, 2004 v	Belgium	5 - 4	Argentina

==== Third place game ====
July 17, 2004 v	Hungary	5 - 7	Japan

==== Final ====
July 17, 2004 v	Great Britain	5 - 4 (OT)	Brazil

==== Tournament awards ====
- Best players selected by the directorate:
  - Best Goalkeeper: Rodrigo Santos (Brazil)
  - Best Defenseman: Mark Thomas (United Kingdom)
  - Best Forward: John Dolan (United Kingdom)
