= Inline hockey at the 2009 World Games =

International sports tournament

- Inline Hockey at the World Games 2009 official logo

Tournament details
- Host country: Taiwan
- Venue(s): 1 (in 1 host city)
- Dates: 23 July – 26 July
- Teams: 6

Final positions
- Champions: United States
- Runner-up: France
- Third place: Czech Republic
- Fourth place: Switzerland

Tournament statistics
- Games played: 15
- Goals scored: 98 (6.53 per game)

The Inline hockey at the World Games 2009 competition took place between 23 and 26 July in Taiwan. The games were played in the I-Shou University gymnasium in Kaohsiung. The United States won the competition going undefeated with a 5–0–0 record.

== Rosters ==
Each team's roster for the World Games 2009 consists of at least eight skaters (forwards, and defencemen) and 2 goaltenders, and at most 16 skaters and three goaltenders.

== Preliminary round ==
Six participating teams played every team in a round-robin. Medals were given to teams based on total points accumulated.

All games are played at the I-Shou University Gymnasium in Kaohsiung.

Team	Pld	W	D	L	GF	GA	GD	Pts	Result
United States	5	5	0	0	25	9	+16	10	Gold medal
France	5	3	1	1	19	10	+9	7	Silver medal
Czech Republic	5	3	0	2	18	10	+8	6	Bronze medal
Switzerland	5	2	0	3	23	16	+7	4	
Italy	5	1	1	3	11	17	−6	3	
Chinese Taipei	5	0	0	5	2	36	−34	0	
