= Czech national hockey team =

Czech national hockey team may refer to:

- Czech Republic men's national field hockey team
- Czech Republic women's national field hockey team
- Czech Republic men's national ice hockey team
- Czech Republic women's national ice hockey team
- Czech Republic men's national inline hockey team
