= Ernie Hartlieb =

American ice hockey player

- Born: April 11, 1979 (age 47) Warren, Michigan
- Height: 6 ft 2 in (188 cm)
- Weight: 210 lb (95 kg; 15 st 0 lb)
- Position: Left wing
- Shot: Right
- ECHL team Former teams: Florida Everblades; AHL; Worcester IceCats; Lowell Lock Monsters; Grand Rapids Griffins; Rochester Americans; ECHL; Dayton Bombers; Arkansas RiverBlades
- Playing career: 2000–2012

Ernie Hartlieb (born April 11, 1979) is an American former ice hockey left wing who primarily played with the Florida Everblades of the ECHL. Hartlieb played college hockey for Miami University, earning the Terry Flanagan Memorial Award in 1999 from the CCHA, for demonstrating "perseverance, dedication and courage while overcoming severe adversity" as Hartlieb overcame a severe head injury suffered on the ice in 1997, comatose as a result for 11 days, and went on to a stellar career with the RedHawks.

Hartlieb has competed with the United States men's national inline hockey team at the IIHF InLine Hockey World Championship, winning a gold medal and an individual scoring title and Tournament "Best Defensemen" in 2004., and a silver medal and "Best Defenseman" award in 2009.

== Career statistics ==
Ernie Hartlieb
Medal record

Representing United States

Inline hockey

IIHF InLine Hockey World Championship
Gold medal – first place	2004	Bad Tölz
Silver medal – second place	2009	Ingolstadt

=== Regular season and playoffs ===
			Regular season					Playoffs
Season	Team	League	GP	G	A	Pts	PIM	GP	G	A	Pts	PIM
1997–98	Miami University (Ohio)	CCHA	9	1	0	1	0
1998–99	Miami University (Ohio)	CCHA	34	6	8	14	26
1999–00	Miami University (Ohio)	CCHA	36	3	15	18	30
2000–01	Miami University (Ohio)	CCHA	37	10	12	22	22
2000–01	Dayton Bombers	ECHL	5	0	2	2	2	3	0	0	0	0
2001-02	Arkansas RiverBlades	ECHL	71	7	27	34	56
2002-03	Worcester IceCats	AHL	24	7	8	15	12	3	0	0	0	0
2002-03	Arkansas RiverBlades	ECHL	47	21	34	55	43
2003-04	Worcester IceCats	AHL	63	14	21	35	60	6	1	0	1	6
2004-05	Lowell Lock Monsters	AHL	2	0	0	0	2
2004-05	Florida Everblades	ECHL	15	3	9	12	29	15	6	3	9	6
2004-05	Grand Rapids Griffins	AHL	44	3	6	9	23
2005-06	Florida Everblades	ECHL	55	18	36	54	32	8	1	6	7	8
2006-07	Florida Everblades	ECHL	62	8	25	33	56	16	1	5	6	12
2007-08	Florida Everblades	ECHL	72	24	41	65	87	3	0	0	0	4
2008-09	Florida Everblades	ECHL	70	21	33	54	62	11	2	3	5	4
2009-10	Florida Everblades	ECHL	67	12	27	39	79	8	0	3	3	6
2009-10	Rochester Americans	AHL	9	2	2	4	0
2010-11	Florida Everblades	ECHL	6	0	0	0	0
2011-12	Florida Everblades	ECHL	3	0	0	0	0
2012-13	Florida Everblades	ECHL	5	1	0	1	4
2013-14	Florida Everblades	ECHL	3	0	0	0	0
2018-19	Florida Everblades	ECHL	1	1	0	1	0
AHL totals			142	26	37	63	97	9	1	0	1	6
CCHA totals			116	20	35	55	78
ECHL totals			482	116	234	350	450	64	10	20	30	40

== Honors ==
Hartlieb's jersey number with the Florida Everblades, 9, was retired in a ceremony before a game against the Orlando Solar Bears on October 19, 2012. Hartlieb was presented with an ECHL Championship ring (he filled in on with the team in the 2011-12 regular season, but did not appear in the playoffs), and hoisted the Kelly Cup. A banner made with his jersey number 9, was hung to the rafters of Germain Arena next to the banners for Reggie Berg and Tom Buckley.

Awards and achievements
Preceded by Bryan Adams	Terry Flanagan Memorial Award; 1998–99	Succeeded by Sean Peach
