= 1996 IIHF InLine Hockey World Championship =

International sports tournament

Tournament details
- Host country: United States
- Venue(s): 2 (in 2 host cities)
- Dates: August 4–10, 1996
- Teams: 11

Final positions
- Champions: United States
- Runner-up: Canada
- Third place: Finland

The 1996 IIHF InLine Hockey World Championship was the first IIHF InLine Hockey World Championship, the premier annual international inline hockey tournament. It took place in Minneapolis and Saint Paul, Minnesota, United States, with the gold-medal game played on August 10, 1996.

== Teams ==
The eleven-team tournament was split into three groups.

Group A

- Czech Republic
- Germany
- Italy

Group B

- Australia
- Austria
- Canada
- Finland

Group C

- Japan
- Russia
- Switzerland
- United States

== Tournament ==
=== Preliminary round ===
August 4, 1996	Canada	23 - 1	Australia

August 4, 1996	United States	30 - 1	Japan

August 4, 1996	Russia	10 - 7	Switzerland

August 4, 1996	Germany	6 - 5	Czech Republic

August 4, 1996	Finland	17 - 3	Austria

August 5, 1996	Czech Republic	8 - 6	Italy

August 5, 1996	Canada	17 - 2	Austria

August 5, 1996	Finland	28 - 2	Australia

August 5, 1996	United States	18 - 3	Switzerland

August 5, 1996	Russia	11 - 2	Japan

August 6, 1996	United States	14 - 5	Russia

August 6, 1996	Canada	8 - 8	Finland

August 6, 1996	Austria	10 - 6	Australia

August 6, 1996	Switzerland	16 - 6	Japan

August 6, 1996	Italy	7 - 6	Germany

=== Playoff round ===
==== Quarterfinals ====
August 7, 1996	Canada	12 - 3	Russia

August 7, 1996	United States	14 - 6	Switzerland

August 7, 1996	Finland	7 - 4	Italy

August 7, 1996	Germany	10 - 7	Czech Republic

==== Semifinals ====
August 9, 1996	Canada	6 - 5	Finland

August 9, 1996	United States	16 - 9	Germany

==== Gold medal game ====
August 10, 1996	United States	13 - 5	Canada

==== Bronze medal game ====
August 10, 1996	Finland	5 - 3	Germany

=== Consolation round ===
August 9, 1996	Australia	11 - 9	Japan

August 9, 1996	Switzerland	12 - 7	Czech Republic

August 9, 1996	Russia	10 - 9	Italy

==== 5th place game ====
August 10, 1996	Russia	8 - 7	Switzerland

==== 7th place game ====
August 10, 1996	Italy	9 - 7	Czech Republic

==== Relegation ====
August 10, 1996	Austria	8 - 4	Japan
