= 1997 IIHF InLine Hockey World Championship =

International sports tournament

Tournament details
- Host country: United States
- Venue(s): 2 (in 1 host city)
- Dates: July 1997
- Teams: 12

Final positions
- Champions: United States
- Runner-up: Canada
- Third place: Switzerland

The 1997 IIHF InLine Hockey World Championship was the second IIHF InLine Hockey World Championship, the premier annual international inline hockey tournament. It took place at Anaheim, California, United States, with the gold-medal game played July 25, 1997, at the Arrowhead Pond.

== Teams ==
The twelve-team tournament was split into two groups.

Group A comprised

- Canada
- Finland
- Germany
- Russia
- Switzerland
- United States

and Group B comprised

- Australia
- Austria
- Czech Republic
- Italy
- Japan
- Netherlands

== Tournament ==
=== Preliminary round ===
Scores

| July 17, 1997 | Canada | 10 - 4 | Finland |

| July 17, 1997 | Russia | 6 - 5 | Germany |

| July 17, 1997 | United States | 11 - 6 | Switzerland |

| July 17, 1997 | Australia | 9 - 3 | Japan |

| July 17, 1997 | Czech Republic | 10 - 5 | Austria |

| July 17, 1997 | Italy | 6 - 4 | Netherlands |

| July 18, 1997 | Switzerland | 9 - 3 | Finland |

| July 18, 1997 | Canada | 13 - 6 | Germany |

| July 18, 1997 | United States | 11 - 3 | Russia |

| July 18, 1997 | Italy | 12 - 4 | Japan |

| July 18, 1997 | Austria | 7 - 7 | Netherlands |

| July 18, 1997 | Czech Republic | 15 - 6 | Australia |

| July 19, 1997 | Canada | 15 - 5 | Switzerland |

| July 19, 1997 | Italy | 9 - 5 | Australia |

| July 19, 1997 | Finland | 10 - 5 | Russia |

| July 19, 1997 | Czech Republic | 14 - 4 | Netherlands |

| July 19, 1997 | Austria | 11 - 4 | Japan |

| July 19, 1997 | United States | 16 - 3 | Germany |

| July 20, 1997 | United States | 9 - 6 | Canada |

| July 20, 1997 | Netherlands | 8 - 8 | Australia |

| July 20, 1997 | Russia | 6 - 6 | Switzerland |

| July 20, 1997 | Austria | 4 - 3 | Italy |

| July 20, 1997 | Finland | 9 - 5 | Germany |

| July 20, 1997 | Czech Republic | 15 - 2 | Japan |

| July 21, 1997 | Canada | 12 - 6 | Russia |

| July 21, 1997 | Switzerland | 9 - 5 | Germany |

| July 21, 1997 | United States | 7 - 4 | Finland |

| July 21, 1997 | Netherlands | 18 - 5 | Japan |

| July 21, 1997 | Austria | 9 - 5 | Australia |

| July 21, 1997 | Czech Republic | 6 - 2 | Italy |

Group A standings

| Team | Pld | W | L | D | GF | GA | GD | Pts |
|---|---|---|---|---|---|---|---|---|
| United States | 5 | 5 | 0 | 0 | 54 | 22 | +32 | 10 |
| Canada | 5 | 4 | 1 | 0 | 56 | 30 | +26 | 8 |
| Switzerland | 5 | 2 | 2 | 1 | 35 | 40 | −5 | 5 |
| Finland | 5 | 2 | 3 | 0 | 30 | 36 | −6 | 4 |
| Russia | 5 | 1 | 3 | 1 | 26 | 44 | −18 | 3 |
| Germany | 5 | 0 | 5 | 0 | 24 | 53 | −29 | 0 |

Group B standings

| Team | Pld | W | L | D | GF | GA | GD | Pts |
|---|---|---|---|---|---|---|---|---|
| Czech Republic | 5 | 5 | 0 | 0 | 64 | 19 | +45 | 10 |
| Austria | 5 | 3 | 1 | 1 | 36 | 29 | +7 | 7 |
| Italy | 5 | 3 | 2 | 0 | 32 | 23 | +9 | 6 |
| Netherlands | 5 | 1 | 2 | 2 | 41 | 40 | +1 | 4 |
| Australia | 5 | 1 | 3 | 1 | 33 | 44 | −11 | 3 |
| Japan | 5 | 0 | 5 | 0 | 18 | 69 | −51 | 0 |

=== Playoff round ===
==== Quarterfinals ====
| July 23, 1997 | Switzerland | 10 - 9 | Czech Republic |

| July 23, 1997 | Russia | 8 - 4 | Finland |

==== Semifinals ====
| July 24, 1997 | Canada | 8 - 0 | Switzerland |

| July 24, 1997 | United States | 11 - 3 | Russia |

==== Gold medal game ====
| July 25, 1997 | United States | 5 - 4 | Canada |

==== Bronze medal game ====
| July 25, 1997 | Switzerland | 5 - 2 | Russia |

=== Consolation round ===
| July 23, 1997 | Netherlands | 7 - 6 | Australia |

| July 23, 1997 | Italy | 12 - 3 | Japan |

| July 24, 1997 | Austria | 6 - 4 | Italy |

| July 24, 1997 | Australia | 13 - 6 | Japan |

| July 24, 1997 | Germany | 12 - 4 | Netherlands |

==== 5th place game ====
| July 24, 1997 | Czech Republic | 8 - 5 | Finland |

==== 7th place game ====
| July 25, 1997 | Germany | 8 - 4 | Austria |

==== 9th place game ====
| July 25, 1997 | Italy | 9 - 6 | Netherlands |
