= 2006 IIHF Men's InLine Hockey World Championship =

International sports tournament

Tournament details
- Host country: Hungary
- Venue: 1 (in 1 host city)
- Dates: July 10 - July 16
- Teams: 16

Final positions
- Champions: United States (5th title)
- Runners-up: Sweden
- Third place: Finland

The 2006 Men's World Ice Hockey Championships is the 11th such event hosted by the International Ice Hockey Federation. It took place between July 10 and July 16, 2006.

The preliminary round was played in four groups (A-D) with four teams each. The groups A and B form Pool A, the groups C and D form Pool B.

The two last-placed teams of the groups A and B and the two first-placed teams of the groups C and D play for fourth place in group A and B to participate in the Play-Offs of Pool A. The losers of the games between fourth A and first C, fourth B and first D play as first place in group C and D to participate in the Play-Offs of Pool B. The ranking of the groups is based according to the result of the last World Championships' performance of the respective countries in the IIHF Inline Hockey Program and the qualification rounds.

== Top Division ==
=== Preliminary round ===
==== Group A ====
Team	Pld	W	OTW	OTL	L	GF	GA	GD	Pts
Sweden	3	2	1	0	0	16	11	+5	8
Germany	3	2	0	0	1	21	8	+13	6
Czech Republic	3	1	0	1	1	11	17	−6	4
Austria	3	0	0	0	3	8	20	−12	0

July 10, 2006; 16:00	Czech Republic	0 - 10 (0-2, 0-3, 0-0, 0-5)	Germany	Budapest, Hungary

July 10, 2006; 19:00	Austria	4 - 5 (1-1, 2-1, 1-1, 0-2)	Sweden	Budapest, Hungary

July 11, 2006; 16:00	Sweden	7 - 4 (2-0, 0-2, 4-0, 1-2)	Germany	Budapest, Hungary

July 11, 2006; 19:00	Czech Republic	8 - 3 (2-2, 1-0, 2-1, 3-1)	Austria	Budapest, Hungary

July 12, 2006; 16:00	Germany	7 - 1 (4-0, 0-0, 1-0, 2-1)	Austria	Budapest, Hungary

July 12, 2006; 20:00	Sweden	4 - 3 (SO) (2-2, 1-0, 0-0, 0-1, 0-0, 1-0)	Czech Republic	Budapest, Hungary

==== Group B ====
Team	Pld	W	OTW	OTL	L	GF	GA	GD	Pts
United States	3	3	0	0	0	18	9	+9	9
Finland	3	2	0	0	1	24	7	+17	6
Slovakia	3	1	0	0	2	10	18	−8	3
Slovenia	3	0	0	0	3	3	21	−18	0

July 10, 2006; 14:00	United States	9 - 3 (4-1, 0-1, 2-0, 3-1)	Slovakia	Budapest, Hungary

July 10, 2006; 20:00	Slovenia	0 - 12 (0-5, 0-1, 0-2, 0-4)	Finland	Budapest, Hungary

July 11, 2006; 14:00	United States	3 - 1 (0-0, 1-1, 0-0, 2-0)	Slovenia	Budapest, Hungary

July 11, 2006; 19:00	Finland	7 - 1 (0-0, 4-1, 2-0, 1-0)	Slovakia	Budapest, Hungary

July 12, 2006; 16:00	Slovakia	6 - 2 (2-1, 2-0, 1-1, 1-0)	Slovenia	Budapest, Hungary

July 12, 2006; 20:00	Finland	5 - 6 (1-2, 2-1, 1-3, 1-0)	United States	Budapest, Hungary

=== Qualifying round ===
July 13, 2006; 18:00	Austria	7 - 2 (3-0, 3-1, 1-1, 0-0)	Hungary	Budapest, Hungary

Austria remains in Top Division, Hungary remains in Division I

July 13, 2006; 10:00	Slovenia	8 - 5 (3-2, 1-1, 2-1, 2-1)	Great Britain	Budapest, Hungary

Slovenia remains in Top Division, Great Britain remains in Division I

=== Championship Round ===
==== Draw ====
Quarterfinals
A3	Czech Republic	3
B2	Finland	7
B4	Slovenia	1
A1	Sweden	12
B3	Slovakia	2
A2	Germany	5
A4	Austria	0
B1	United States	10

Semifinals
QF1	Sweden	8
QF2	Finland	3
QF3	United States	3
QF4	Germany	2

Finals
SF2	Sweden	0
SF1	United States	6
Bronze medal game
SF1	Germany	4
SF2	Finland	5*

Note: * denotes overtime period(s).

==== Placement games ====
7th place game

July 15, 2006	Slovenia	10 - 6	Austria

5th place game

July 15, 2006	Czech Republic	8 - 2	Slovakia

=== Ranking and statistics ===
2007 Men's World Inline Hockey

Championships Winners

United States

==== Final standings ====
The final standings of the tournament according to IIHF:

Rk.	Team
1st place, gold medalist(s)	United States
2nd place, silver medalist(s)	Sweden
3rd place, bronze medalist(s)	Finland
4.	Germany
5.	Czech Republic
6.	Slovakia
7.	Slovenia
8.	Austria

== Division I ==
=== Qualification ===
==== European Zone ====
Played in Pfaffenhofen, Germany

Team	Pld	W	OTW	OTL	L	GF	GA	GD	Pts
Croatia	2	2	0	0	0	22	7	+15	4
Bulgaria	2	1	0	0	1	13	18	−5	2
Liechtenstein	2	0	0	0	2	12	22	−10	0

August 14, 2005	Croatia	10 - 3	Bulgaria

August 15, 2005	Croatia	12 - 4	Liechtenstein

August 16, 2005	Bulgaria	10 - 8	Liechtenstein

=== Preliminary round ===
==== Group C ====
Team	Pld	W	OTW	OTL	L	GF	GA	GD	Pts
Hungary	3	3	0	0	0	19	9	+10	9
Brazil	3	2	0	0	1	16	12	+4	6
Australia	3	0	1	0	2	11	18	−7	2
Croatia	3	0	0	1	2	11	18	−7	1

July 10, 2006; 15:00	Brazil	6 - 2 (1-0, 1-1, 3-0, 1-1)	Australia	Budapest, Hungary

July 10, 2006; 18:00	Croatia	2 - 6 (1-1, 1-2, 0-2, 0-1)	Hungary	Budapest, Hungary

July 11, 2006; 15:00	Brazil	7 - 5 (1-1, 3-0, 1-1, 2-3)	Croatia	Budapest, Hungary

July 11, 2006; 19:00	Hungary	8 - 4 (1-1, 2-1, 2-0, 3-2)	Australia	Budapest, Hungary

July 12, 2006; 15:00	Australia	5 - 4 (OT) (0-1, 1-0, 0-1, 3-2, 1-0)	Croatia	Budapest, Hungary

July 12, 2006; 20:00	Hungary	5 - 3 (2-1, 0-0, 2-0, 1-2)	Brazil	Budapest, Hungary

=== Group D ===
Team	Pld	W	OTW	OTL	L	GF	GA	GD	Pts
Great Britain	3	3	0	0	0	14	11	+3	9
Japan	3	1	1	0	1	16	11	+5	5
Namibia	3	0	1	0	2	9	14	−5	2
Argentina	3	0	0	2	1	13	16	−3	2

July 10, 2006; 13:00	Great Britain	3 - 2 (1-0, 0-0, 0-1, 2-1)	Namibia	Budapest, Hungary

July 10, 2006; 17:00	Argentina	4 - 5 (OT) (2-0, 1-1, 1-1, 0-2, 0-1)	Japan	Budapest, Hungary

July 11, 2006; 13:00	Great Britain	6 - 5 (0-1, 2-1, 2-0, 2-3)	Argentina	Budapest, Hungary

July 11, 2006; 17:00	Japan	7 - 2 (3-0, 0-1, 1-1, 3-0)	Namibia	Budapest, Hungary

July 12, 2006; 16:00	Namibia	5 - 4 (OT) (1-0, 2-1, 1-1, 0-2, 1-0)	Argentina	Budapest, Hungary

July 12, 2006; 20:00	Japan	4 - 5 (1-1, 1-0, 2-2, 0-2)	Great Britain	Budapest, Hungary

=== Finals round ===
==== Draw ====
Quarterfinals
C3	Australia	6
D2	Japan	7
D4	Argentina	4
C1	Hungary	9
C2	Brazil	7
D3	Namibia	1
C4	Croatia	8
D1	Great Britain	12

Semifinals
QF1	Japan	1
QF2	Hungary	6
QF3	Brazil	3
QF4	Great Britain	4

Finals
SF2	Hungary	5
SF1	Great Britain	6
Bronze medal game
SF1	Japan	1
SF2	Brazil	4

==== Placement games ====
7th place game

July 15, 2006	Croatia	7 - 5	Argentina

5th place game

July 15, 2006	Namibia	4 - 3 (OT)	Australia
