= Henrik Lundqvist =

Swedish ice hockey player (born 1982)

- Hockey Hall of Fame, 2023
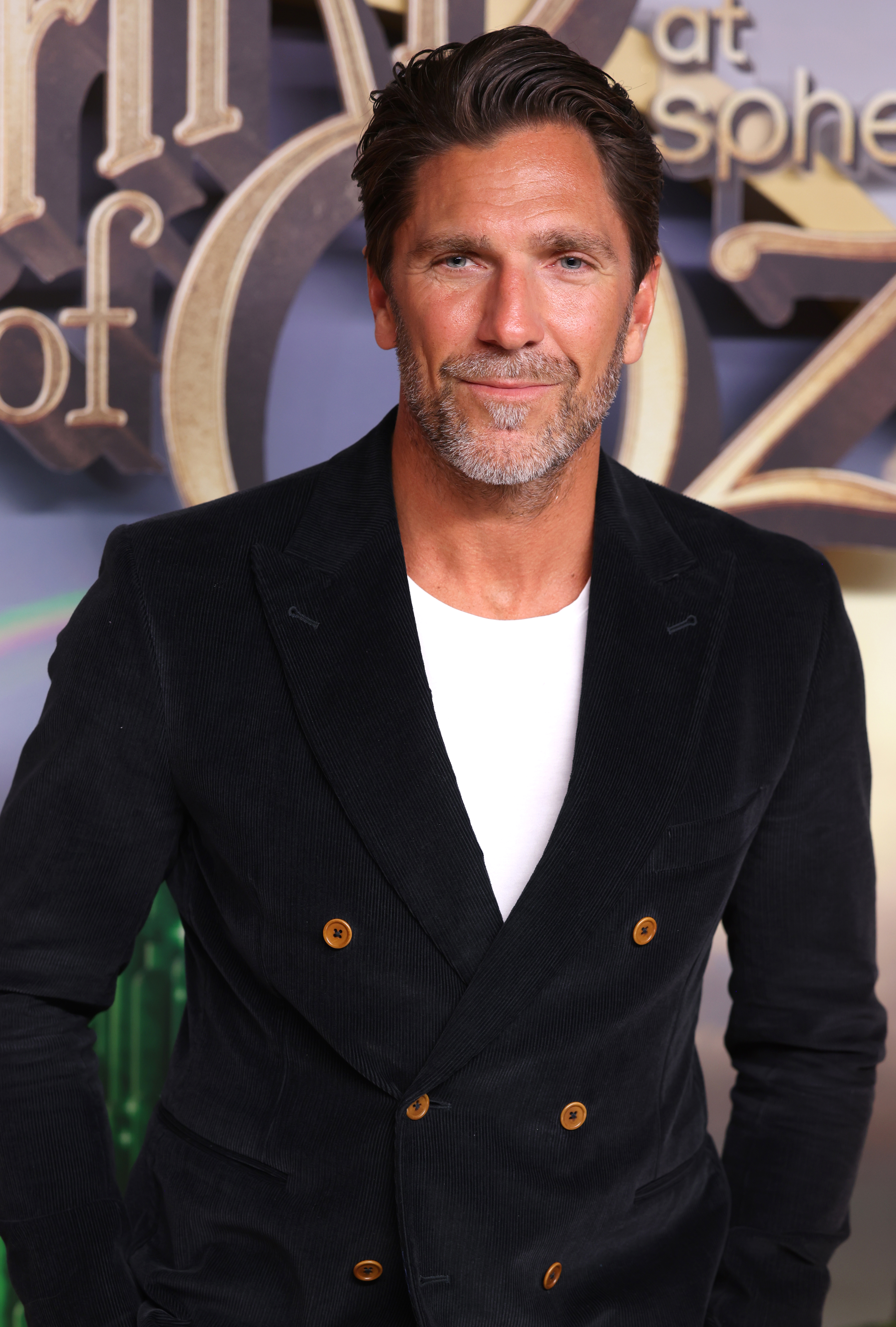
- Lundqvist in 2025
- Born: 2 March 1982 (age 44) Åre, Sweden
- Height: 6 ft 1 in (185 cm)
- Weight: 182 lb (83 kg; 13 st 0 lb)
- Position: Goaltender
- Caught: Left
- Played for: Frölunda HC; New York Rangers
- National team: Sweden
- NHL draft: 205th overall, 2000; New York Rangers
- Playing career: 2000–2020
- Website: www.hlundqvist30.com

Henrik Lundqvist (Swedish pronunciation: [ˈhɛ̌nːrɪk ˈlɵ̂nːdkvɪst]; born 2 March 1982) is a Swedish former professional ice hockey player. He played as a goaltender for 15 seasons in the National Hockey League (NHL) with the New York Rangers. Before winning the Vezina Trophy in 2012, he was nominated in each of his first three seasons, and is the only goaltender in NHL history to record eleven 30-win seasons in his first twelve seasons. He holds the record for most wins by a European-born goaltender in the NHL. His dominating play during his rookie season resulted in the New York media and Rangers fans giving him the nickname "King Henrik".

Lundqvist is considered a butterfly style goaltender, though unorthodox because of the aggressive way he performs the butterfly. He is best known for his athleticism, strong positional play, concentration on tracking pucks, upright torso stance and quick reflexes. Lundqvist was inducted into the Hockey Hall of Fame in 2023.

In Europe before the NHL, Lundqvist played for Frölunda HC in Swedish Elitserien. During his years in Sweden, he developed into the league's finest goaltender, winning the Honken Trophy in three consecutive seasons (2003, 2004, and 2005). In 2005, he also won two of the most prestigious awards in Swedish ice hockey, the Guldpucken (Golden Puck) and the Guldhjälmen (Golden Helmet). Internationally, he played for the Sweden men's national team. During the 2006 Winter Olympics in Turin, he led Sweden to their second Olympic gold medal. He was inducted into the IIHF Hall of Fame in 2025.

== Early life ==
Lundqvist grew up with his identical twin brother Joel in Åre, Jämtland, an area where alpine skiing is the most popular winter activity, though Henrik and Joel chose to play ice hockey over the more popular winter sports. During the winters, their kindergarten teachers used the kindergarten's 9 m × 3 m (29.5 ft × 9.8 ft) sandpit to freeze an outdoor ice rink where the twins would frequently skate. Their interest in hockey grew even stronger when their father Peter took the twins to see Västra Frölunda HC play in Scandinavium, Gothenburg. Henrik has said he and Joel were very competitive growing up, in sports as well as school. Peter worked for a company which sponsored Frölunda, and Henrik and Joel saw many games in Scandinavium, where Frölunda became their favorite team. In 1990, Henrik and Joel joined Järpens IF and started playing organized hockey for the first time. During one practice, when the coach asked if anyone wanted to be a goaltender, Joel grabbed and raised Henrik's arm and said that his brother would like to. In 1993, the family moved to Båstad, Skåne, in southern Sweden to support their older sister Gabriella's tennis career. Henrik and Joel then joined local team Rögle BK, and were both selected for Scania's regional team in Sverigepucken in 1995. Henrik was selected to play for Scania in TV-pucken in 1996, and in 1997, when Joel was also selected. During the 1997–98 season, Henrik and Joel were extensively scouted by Frölunda, and while playing for Rögle in the 1998 Scandinavium Cup in Gothenburg, Frölunda's junior team manager and under-16 coach Janne Karlsson contacted their father, who told Henrik and Joel about Frölunda's interest in them while driving home to Båstad.

== Professional career ==
=== Frölunda (2000–2005) ===
After having a successful pre-season, Lundqvist made his Elitserien debut in the season opener on 21 September 2000 in a 4–2 loss against Brynäs IF. Lundqvist bounced back and recorded his first win in the following away game against IF Björklöven, stopping 18 shots and only allowing one goal while being short-handed. In his third straight start, Lundqvist allowed two early first period goals in a game against Timrå IK and was pulled in favour of veteran goaltender Håkan Algotsson. Lundqvist would dress for only ten more games that season and earned only one start, a shootout loss to Djurgårdens IF. Lundqvist lost his roster spot to American veteran goaltender Pat Jablonski, who joined the team in October. Tommy Boustedt, the coach of the team at the time, later said that:

Malfeasance, I think in hindsight, that he didn't get to start in more games that season. He showed then that he was that good. He should have played more, no doubt about it.

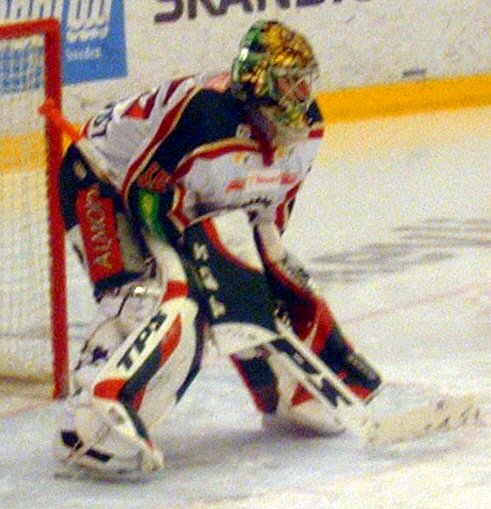
Lundqvist with Frölunda HC in February 2005

Lundqvist played in nine games for IF Mölndal Hockey in the Swedish second tier Allsvenskan before joining Frölunda's junior team in the J20 SuperElit in December. After his poor play in Allsvenskan and a tough start in the J20 SuperElit, he allowed six goals in an exhibition game against Canada. National junior team coaches Bo "Kulon" Lennartsson and Mikael Tisell were worried and decided to have a talk with Lundqvist, where they questioned his motivation. Lundqvist's turning point came at the turn of the year at the 2001 World Junior Ice Hockey Championships in Moscow, where he led the Swedish national junior's team to a fourth-place finish in the tournament. He spent the rest of the season in the J20 SuperElit where he played 18 games, leading the league in minutes played by a goaltender. In the playoffs, he led Frölunda to their second straight Anton Cup win, which came in a 5–2 win over Leksands IF in the final at the Stockholm Globe Arena.

In December 2004, The Hockey News rated Lundqvist the sixth-best European prospect, the lone goaltender in their European top-ten list. Also in December, Lundqvist joined fellow future Rangers prospect Al Montoya on McKeen's list of top goaltending prospects, where he was ranked seventh in the group.

During the 2004–05 season, Lundqvist broke four Swedish national records: lowest goals against average (1.05), highest save percentage (.962), longest goalless streak (at 172 minutes and 29 seconds) and most shutouts in a season (6). He was also named Best Goaltender, Best Player and was selected as the league's MVP by fellow players.

In 180 appearances with Frölunda, he amassed a 1.96 goals against average (GAA) and a .927 save percentage, leading them to four consecutive playoff appearances and winning two titles in 2003 and 2005.

=== New York Rangers (2005–2020) ===
==== Rookie season and arrival of "The King" (2005–2009) ====
At the beginning of his rookie season in 2005–06, Lundqvist was slotted into the Rangers lineup as a backup to starting goaltender Kevin Weekes. After losing Weekes to injury in the second game of the season against the Montreal Canadiens, Lundqvist made his long-anticipated NHL debut on 8 October 2005, against the New Jersey Devils, stopping 24 of 27 shots in a 3–2 overtime loss. Five days later, on 13 October, Lundqvist made his home debut in front of a sold-out crowd of 18,200 at Madison Square Garden in what was his first NHL win, a 4–1 victory against the Devils. Lundqvist, who would be known throughout his NHL career and international play simply as "The King," was first given this nickname by the New York Post Rangers beat columnist, Larry Brooks, on 16 October, following Lundqvist's performance against the Atlanta Thrashers, a 5–1 victory for the Rangers. Larry Brooks, in describing Lundqvist's performance in the game wrote the following:

"When it was over, when the Rangers had sewn up the 5–1 victory over the Thrashers that earned the team a succession of standing ovations from a Garden crowd that's fallen hard for its hard-hat team, the noise reached a crescendo when Henrik Lundqvist took his bows after being announced as the No. 1 star for the second straight game. Fast becoming a Broadway folk hero, King Henrik of Sweden took an abbreviated victory lap around the ice while raising his stick and glove in a return salute to the fans who alternately chanted, "Henrik" and "Lundqvist" throughout the match in which the goaltender made several nifty stops among his 28 saves."

His first career shutout came on 17 October, against the Florida Panthers, only his fifth NHL game, and with it Lundqvist became the first rookie goaltender to record a shutout for the Rangers since John Vanbiesbrouck on 2 January 1985. During the season, Lundqvist also became the first Rangers rookie to post 20 wins in a season since Mike Richter recorded 21 in 1990–91. Finishing the season with 30 wins, Lundqvist broke the Rangers rookie goaltending record of 29 wins, previously held by Jim Henry (1941–42) and Johnny Bower (1953–54). Lundqvist was among the NHL leaders in several categories: fifth in GAA (2.24), fourth in save percentage (.922), 11th in wins (30) and tied for 16th in shutouts with two. However, his regular season success did not continue in the 2006 playoffs, where he appeared in three playoff games, posted a 0–3 record, a 4.40 GAA and an .835 save percentage in a series loss to the New Jersey Devils. He was a finalist for the Vezina Trophy, awarded annually to the NHL's best goaltender, but he was not a finalist for the Calder Memorial Trophy, awarded to the rookie of the year, because of a high quality crop of first-year players. He was named to the NHL All-Rookie Team alongside Sidney Crosby, Alexander Ovechkin, Brad Boyes, Dion Phaneuf and Andrej Meszároš. He won the 2005–06 MetLife/Steven McDonald Extra Effort Award, a New York Rangers team award.

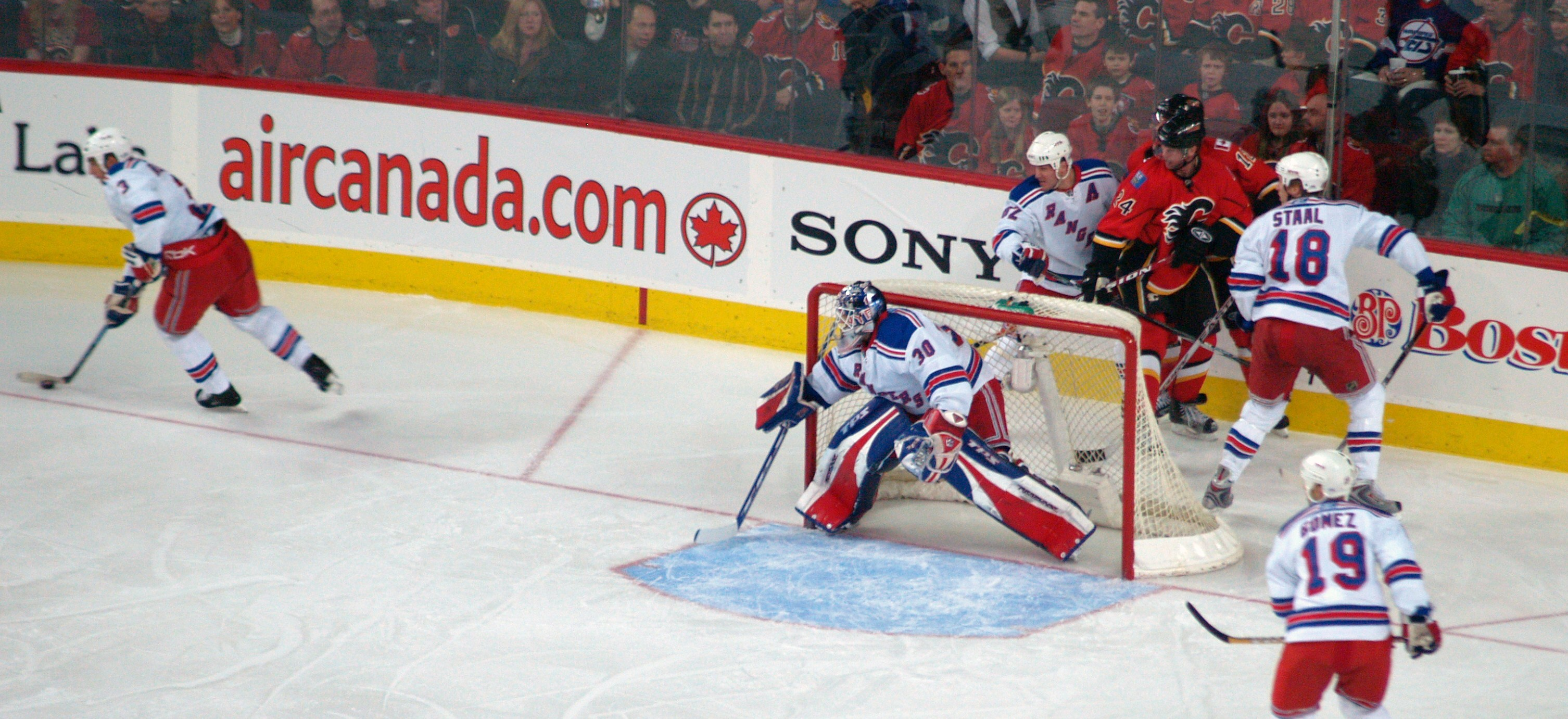
Lundqvist during a game against the Calgary Flames in January 2008

By the start of his second season with the NHL, Lundqvist had already made a name for himself in the hockey world, among his fellow players and with Ranger fans and was now widely known by his nickname "King Henrik" or simply "The King."

On 14 December 2006, against the Dallas Stars, Lundqvist became the first NHL goaltender to face his twin brother, Joel. He and his brother are only the third set of twins to play each other in an NHL game. The game was won by Lundqvist and the Rangers. In the Rangers' 7–0 win in game 3 of the 2007 Eastern Conference quarterfinals over the Atlanta Thrashers, Lundqvist became the first Rangers goaltender since Mike Richter in 1997 to record a playoff shutout. The win was also the Rangers' first home playoff win since Richter's shutout. For the second consecutive year, Lundqvist was a finalist for the Vezina Trophy. Because Lundqvist was tied with Miikka Kiprusoff of the Calgary Flames for third place in balloting, there were four finalists for an NHL individual trophy for the first time in league history.

During the 2007 off-season, Lundqvist signed a one-year, US$4.25 million contract extension with the Rangers. On 13 February 2008, Lundqvist signed a six-year, US$41.25 million contract extension with the Rangers averaging $6.875 million per season. This made him the highest-paid goaltender in the NHL on average over the length of his contract. On 24 February, Lundqvist became the first Rangers goaltender to record eight shutouts in a single season since Eddie Giacomin in 1970–71. On 6 March, he recorded his 30th win of the season, making him just the second goaltender, along with Ron Hextall, to record at least 30 wins in each of his first three NHL seasons. On 9 March, Lundqvist became the first Rangers goaltender to record nine shutouts in a season since Eddie Giacomin's 1966–67 season in a 1–0 win against the Boston Bruins. Lundqvist was named the Rangers Most Valuable Player for the fifth consecutive season (2006–07 to 2010–11), as voted by the Professional Hockey Writers' Association. He became the first Rangers player to earn the Rangers MVP award five consecutive times.

On 1 October 2008, Lundqvist and the New York Rangers won the Victoria Cup in 2008 when they won 4–3 over Metallurg Magnitogorsk. On 8 January 2009, Lundqvist was selected to play in the 2009 NHL All-Star Game at Bell Centre. On 24 January, Lundqvist made his first All-Star appearance in the Elimination Shootout. He stopped 12 of 16 shots in the shootout as Shane Doan won the competition. The next day, he played in the second period of the All-Star Game, in which he gave up six goals. On 12 March, Lundqvist became the first NHL goaltender to win at least 30 games in his first four seasons with a win over the Nashville Predators.

==== Establishing himself, Stanley Cup Final appearance, Vezina Trophy (2009–2017) ====
In September 2009, despite having played only four seasons with the club, the book 100 Ranger Greats ranked Lundqvist at No. 90 all-time of more than 900 New York Rangers' players who had played during the team's first 82 seasons. On 25 March 2010, Lundqvist became the first NHL goaltender to win at least 30 games in his first five seasons after defeating the New Jersey Devils 4–3 in a shootout. He ended the season with a 35–27–10 record, .921 save percentage and 2.38 GAA in 73 games as the Rangers would finish the season as the ninth seed in the East, missing the playoffs for the first time in Lundqvist's career, finishing one point out of the last playoff spot.

In January 2011, Lundqvist and teammate Marc Staal were named All-Stars for the 2011 NHL All-Star Game. Both players were drafted by Staal's older brother Eric, who was one of the captains for the event. On 30 January 2011, Lundqvist played in the third period of the All-Star game, stopping 11 of 14 shots. This was his second All-Star appearance. He also became the first goaltender to face and stop a penalty shot in the 57-year history of the NHL All-Star Game (the penalty shot was attempted by Matt Duchene of the Colorado Avalanche). On 17 February, Lundqvist earned his 200th NHL win in a 4–3 shootout victory over the Los Angeles Kings at Madison Square Garden. On 19 March, Lundqvist became the first NHL goaltender to win at least 30 games in his first six seasons in a 6–3 win over the Montreal Canadiens. Lundqvist ended the season with 68 games played with a 36–27–5 record, .923 save percentage and 2.28 GAA as the Rangers narrowly returned to the playoffs having finished as the eighth and final seed in the East. In the 2011 playoffs, Lundqvist played in all five games as he and the Rangers were defeated by the top-seeded Washington Capitals in the opening round in five games.

On 24 January 2012, Lundqvist earned his 40th career shutout, defeating the Winnipeg Jets 3–0 at Madison Square Garden. After making 42 saves in a 3–0 shutout victory over the Boston Bruins on 14 February 2012, Rangers fans began using the term "Lundsanity" in association with Lundqvist, as around this time the term "Linsanity" was being used to describe basketball player Jeremy Lin's meteoric rise to fame with the National Basketball Association's New York Knicks, who, like the Rangers, also play at Madison Square Garden. On 27 February, Lundqvist extended his own record as he became the first NHL goaltender to win at least 30 games in his first seven seasons in a 2–0 shutout win over the New Jersey Devils. On 20 June, Lundqvist won the Vezina Trophy at the 2012 NHL Awards in Las Vegas. Lundqvist was also a finalist for the Hart Memorial Trophy and the Ted Lindsay Award along with Tampa Bay Lightning forward Steven Stamkos and Pittsburgh Penguins forward Evgeni Malkin with both awards eventually being awarded to Malkin.

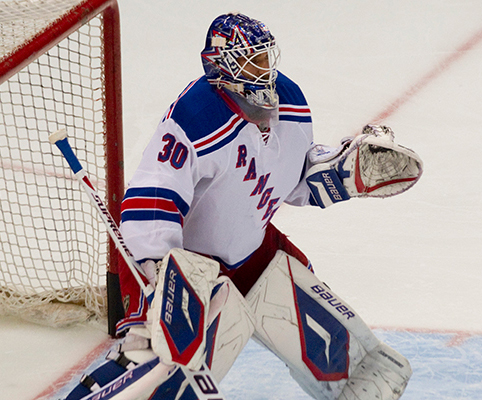
Lundqvist with the Rangers in November 2011. During the 2011–12 season, he became the first NHL goaltender to win at least 30 games in their first seven seasons.

On 24 November 2012, Lundqvist participated in "Operation Hat Trick," a charity hockey game held at Boardwalk Hall in Atlantic City to raise money for Hurricane Sandy victims. On 3 March 2013, Lundqvist took the NHL all-time lead in shootout wins over Martin Brodeur, winning his 43rd against the Buffalo Sabres. On 3 April, Lundqvist won his 268th game, surpassing Eddie Giacomin for the second most wins in Rangers history, behind only Mike Richter. On 13 and 14 May, Lundqvist recorded back-to-back playoff shutouts against the Washington Capitals in the first round of the 2013 playoffs. After upsetting the third-seeded Capitals in seven games in the first round, however, Lundqvist and the Rangers would be eliminated by the fourth-seeded and eventual Stanley Cup runner-up Boston Bruins in five games in the second round.

On 4 December 2013, Lundqvist signed a seven-year, $59.5 million contract extension with the Rangers, making Lundqvist the highest-paid goaltender in the NHL with an average annual cap hit of $8.5 million. On 18 March 2014, Lundqvist passed Mike Richter with his 302nd win to become the most winning goaltender in Rangers history after defeating the Ottawa Senators 8–4. On 22 March, Lundqvist passed Hall of Fame goaltender Eddie Giacomin with his 50th regular season shutout to become the Rangers' shutout leader after defeating the New Jersey Devils 2–0 at the Prudential Center. With the 2–1 victory over the Pittsburgh Penguins in the second round of the 2014 playoffs on 13 May, Lundqvist earned an NHL-record five-straight game 7 wins. On 29 May, he shut-out the sixth-seeded Montreal Canadiens 1–0 in game 6 of the Eastern Conference final, defeating the Canadiens 4–2 in the series and taking the Rangers to the 2014 Stanley Cup Final against the Los Angeles Kings. Lundqvist also surpassed Mike Richter on the most playoff wins list (42) in the process. However, the Rangers would ultimately be defeated by the sixth-seeded Kings 4–1 in the series. In game 5, Kings defenceman Alec Martinez scored in double overtime off a Tyler Toffoli rebound to give the Kings their second Stanley Cup title in three years.

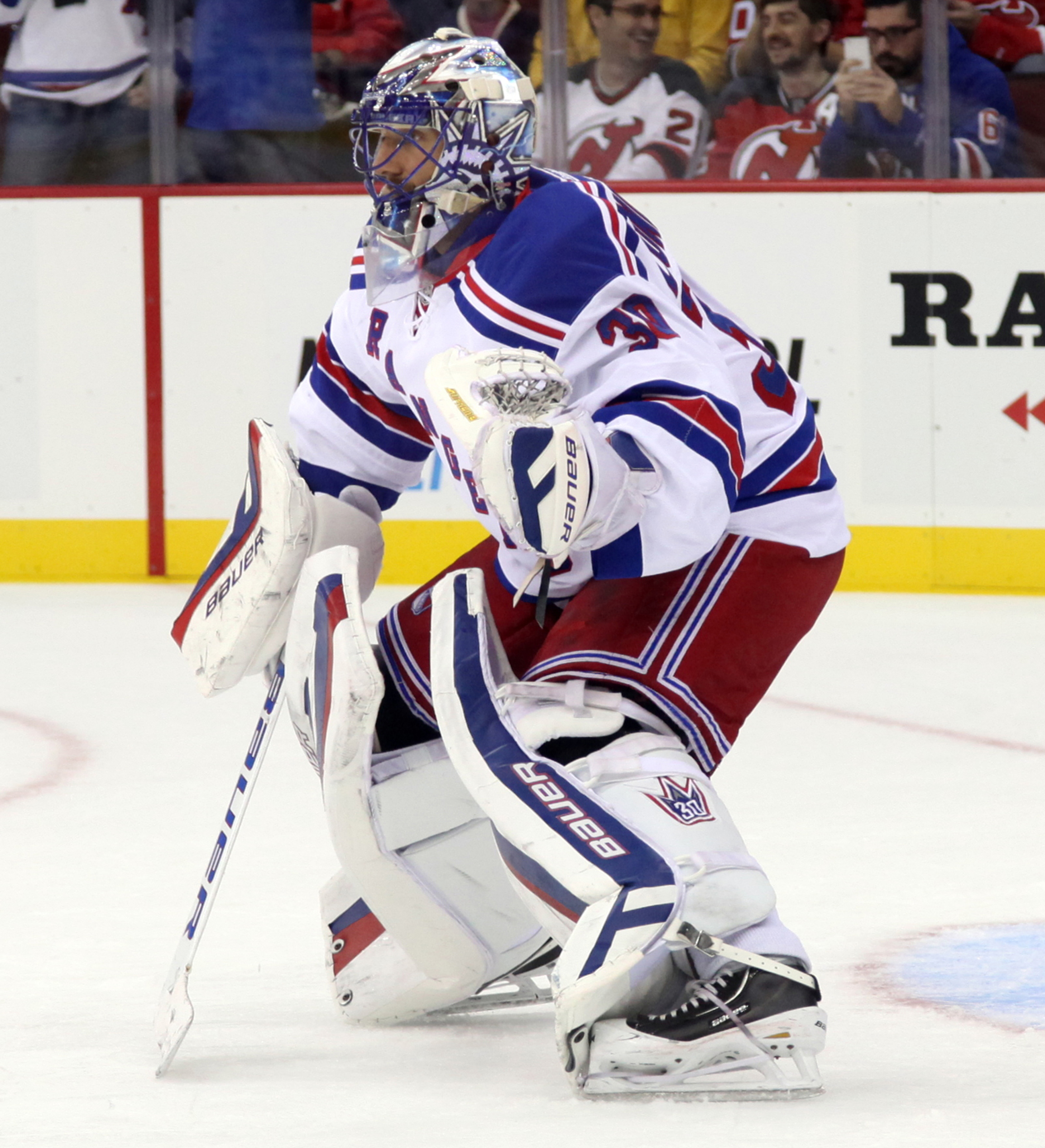
Lundqvist with the Rangers in October 2014

On 31 January 2015, against the Carolina Hurricanes, Lundqvist took a shot to his neck from Brad Malone, but completed the game as well as a 6–3 win over the Florida Panthers three days later. However, tests done the morning after the Panthers game in response to Lundqvist complaining of headaches and lightheadedness detected a sprained blood vessel in his neck. Lundqvist was expected to miss 4-6 weeks due to the injury. Despite the superior performance of backup goaltender Cam Talbot during Lundqvist's absence, Lundqvist would remain the Rangers' starter upon his return on 28 March, in a 4–2 loss to the Boston Bruins. Despite missing nearly two months, Lundqvist was able to earn 30 wins for the ninth time in his career, going 5–2–0 after returning from the injury. At the end of the 2014–15 season the Rangers won the Presidents' Trophy as the regular season champions. Lundqvist started all 19 Rangers games in the 2015 playoffs and recorded a 2.11 GAA and .928 save percentage. The Rangers eventually reached the Eastern Conference Finals, where they lost in seven games to the Tampa Bay Lightning, one win short from back-to-back appearances in the Stanley Cup Final.

On 16 January 2016, Lundqvist recorded his 20th victory of the season in a 3–2 shootout win over the Philadelphia Flyers, making him the first NHL goaltender to start his career with 11 straight 20-win seasons. Lundqvist also joined Hockey Hall of Fame member Tony Esposito and retired goaltender Martin Brodeur as the only goaltenders with 11 consecutive 20-win seasons at any point in their career. Overall, Lundqvist became the 15th NHL netminder to have won at least 20 games in a season 11 times.

On 1 November 2016, Lundqvist recorded his 60th shutout in a 5–0 win over the St. Louis Blues. On 31 December, Lundqvist recorded his 390th career win in a game against the Colorado Avalanche. In doing so, he surpassed Hall of Fame goaltender Dominik Hašek to become the all-time wins leader among European-born goaltenders. On 11 February 2017, Lundqvist recorded his 400th win in a game against the Colorado Avalanche, becoming the 12th player in NHL history to earn 400 wins. He is also the first European-born goaltender to reach the mark, the first in Rangers history to do so, and the quickest in NHL history to do so.

==== Later seasons in New York (2017–2020) ====
On 16 January 2018, Lundqvist earned his 20th win of the 2017–18 season against the Philadelphia Flyers and became the only goaltender in NHL history to win at least 20 games in 13 consecutive seasons. On 7 March 2019, Lundqvist became the third goaltender in NHL history to play at least 850 games with one franchise in a 3–2 shootout loss to the Detroit Red Wings.

On 3 October 2019, Lundqvist earned his 450th win in the 2019–20 season opener against the Winnipeg Jets, making him the sixth goaltender to reach the mark, and the second one to do so with one franchise. He made 43 saves in the game, tying a franchise record for most by a Rangers goaltender in a season opener, the highest amount since Gump Worsley in 1955. On 25 November against the Minnesota Wild, Lundqvist earned his 455th win and surpassed Curtis Joseph for fifth place in all-time wins in NHL history. Following the 2019–20 season, it became apparent that Lundqvist would be the odd man out following the emergence of Rangers goaltenders Alexandar Georgiev and Igor Shesterkin. Lundqvist was bought out of his contract on 30 September 2020, making him a free agent for the first time in his career.

=== Retirement (2020–2021) ===
On 9 October 2020, Lundqvist signed a one-year, $1.5 million contract with the Washington Capitals. However, on 17 December, Lundqvist announced that he would miss the 2020–21 season due to an irregular heartbeat brought on by pericarditis, which required an open-heart surgery that was performed in January 2021. Lundqvist returned to practice in late February 2021. On 11 April, Lundqvist announced that he would not return to the Capitals lineup during the 2020–21 season.

On 20 August 2021, Lundqvist announced his retirement from professional ice hockey. That same day, the Rangers announced that they would retire number 30 in his honor during the 2021–22 season, which was retired on 28 January 2022.

== International play ==
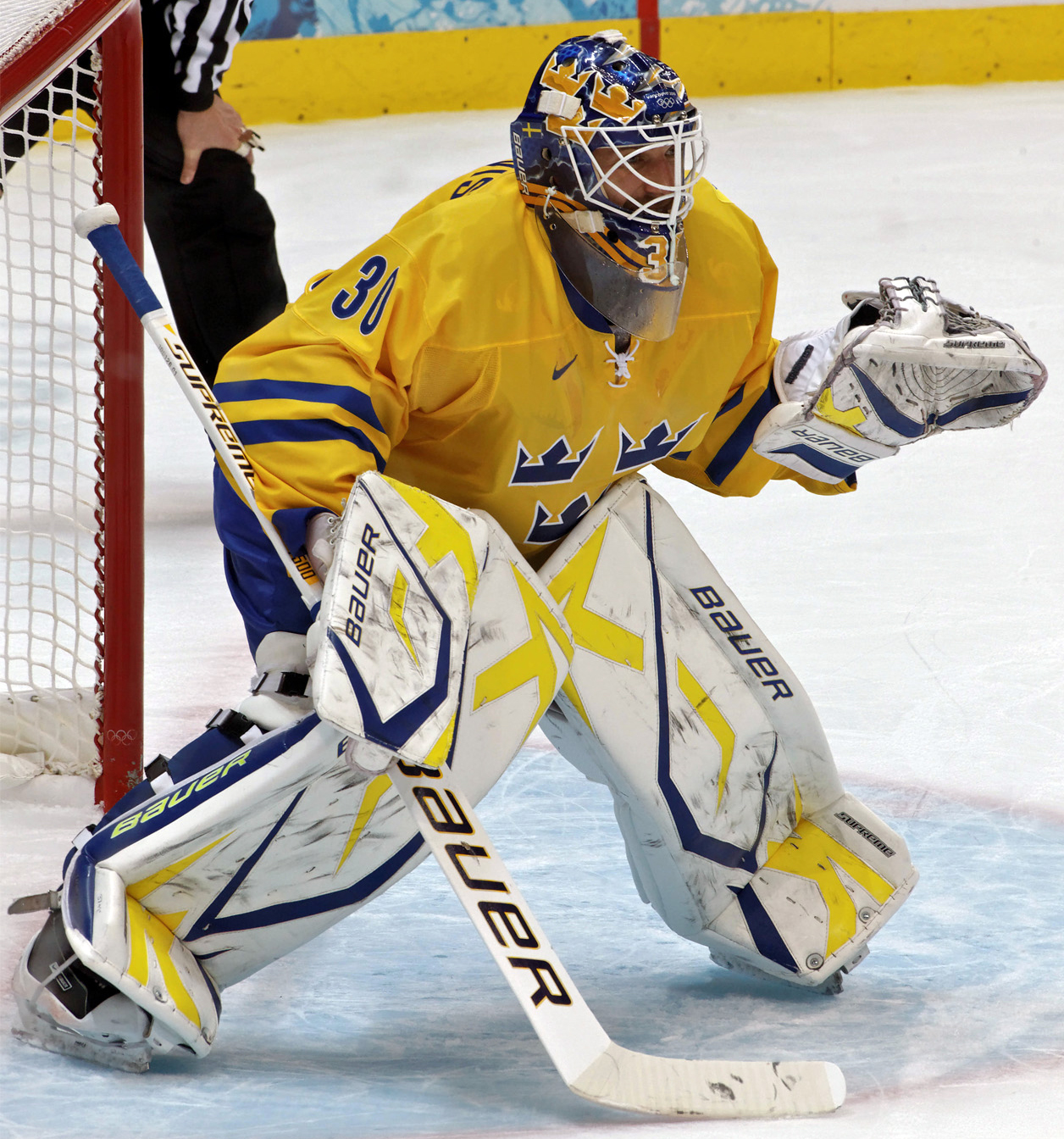
- Lundqvist with the Sweden men's national ice hockey team.

Medal record

Men's ice hockey

Representing Sweden

Winter Olympics
Gold medal – first place	2006 Turin	
Silver medal – second place	2014 Sochi	

World Championships
Gold medal – first place	2017 Cologne/Paris	
Silver medal – second place	2003 Helsinki	
Silver medal – second place	2004 Prague	

Inline hockey

World Championships
Gold medal – first place	2002 Nuremberg	

Lundqvist is the all-time leader among goaltenders, and 11th overall of all players, in games played for the Swedish national junior's ice hockey team.

At the 2001 World U20 Championship, Lundqvist led Sweden to a fourth-place finish in the tournament. After an upset 3–2 win over the hosting nation Russia in the quarterfinals, Sweden lost 1–0 against the Czech Republic in the semifinals, and 2–1 in overtime against Canada in the bronze medal game.

Lundqvist debuted for the senior Swedish team on 10 November 2002 in the 2002 Karjala Tournament in Helsinki.

Lundqvist was selected to the 2003 World Championship but was third string goaltender behind Tommy Salo and Mikael Tellqvist. The following year, at the 2004 World Championship, Lundqvist was the starting goaltender and he was selected to the tournament all-star team.

Lundqvist and Jörgen Jönsson were the only two Elitserien players selected to play for Sweden at the 2004 World Cup of Hockey. Lacking experience on the smaller ice surface, Lundqvist was again third string behind Salo and Tellqvist.

In the 2004–05 Euro Hockey Tour, Lundqvist was named best goaltender in Karjala Tournament and Sweden Hockey Games by the directorate, as well as to the media all-star team in both tournaments. At the 2005 World Championship in Vienna and Innsbruck, Austria, Lundqvist played in all nine games during the tournament, where Sweden eventually lost the bronze medal game against Russia.

Lundqvist's most memorable international performance came at the 2006 Winter Olympics in Turin, where he led Sweden to the gold medal over their archrivals Finland. In six Olympic starts, Lundqvist went 5–1, allowing only 12 goals with a .907 save percentage. He holds the career record for most shutouts in best-on-best hockey, with four.

In the 2017 World Championship, Lundqvist joined the Swedish team in the group stage and stayed in net for all five remaining games, including the final against Canada. Lundqvist had an excellent tournament and recorded a 1.31 GAA, and a .946 save percentage. The final against Canada went into a shootout and Lundqvist stopped all four Canadian chances to lead his country to its tenth World Championship title, on a national team captained by his identical twin brother Joel Lundqvist.

Lundqvist joined Sweden again in the 2019 World Championship right after the NHL season ended. Sweden finished the tournament in fifth place after a 5–4 overtime loss to Finland in the quarterfinals, marking the only time Lundqvist lost to the Finnish team.

=== Inline hockey ===
Lundqvist led team Sweden with spectacular goaltending to their first ever medal in inline hockey when they won gold at the 2002 InLine Hockey World Championship.

== Personal life ==
=== Family ===
Lundqvist has an identical twin brother, Joel, who, like Henrik, is also a former professional ice hockey player.

Lundqvist and his wife have two daughters.

=== Charity work ===
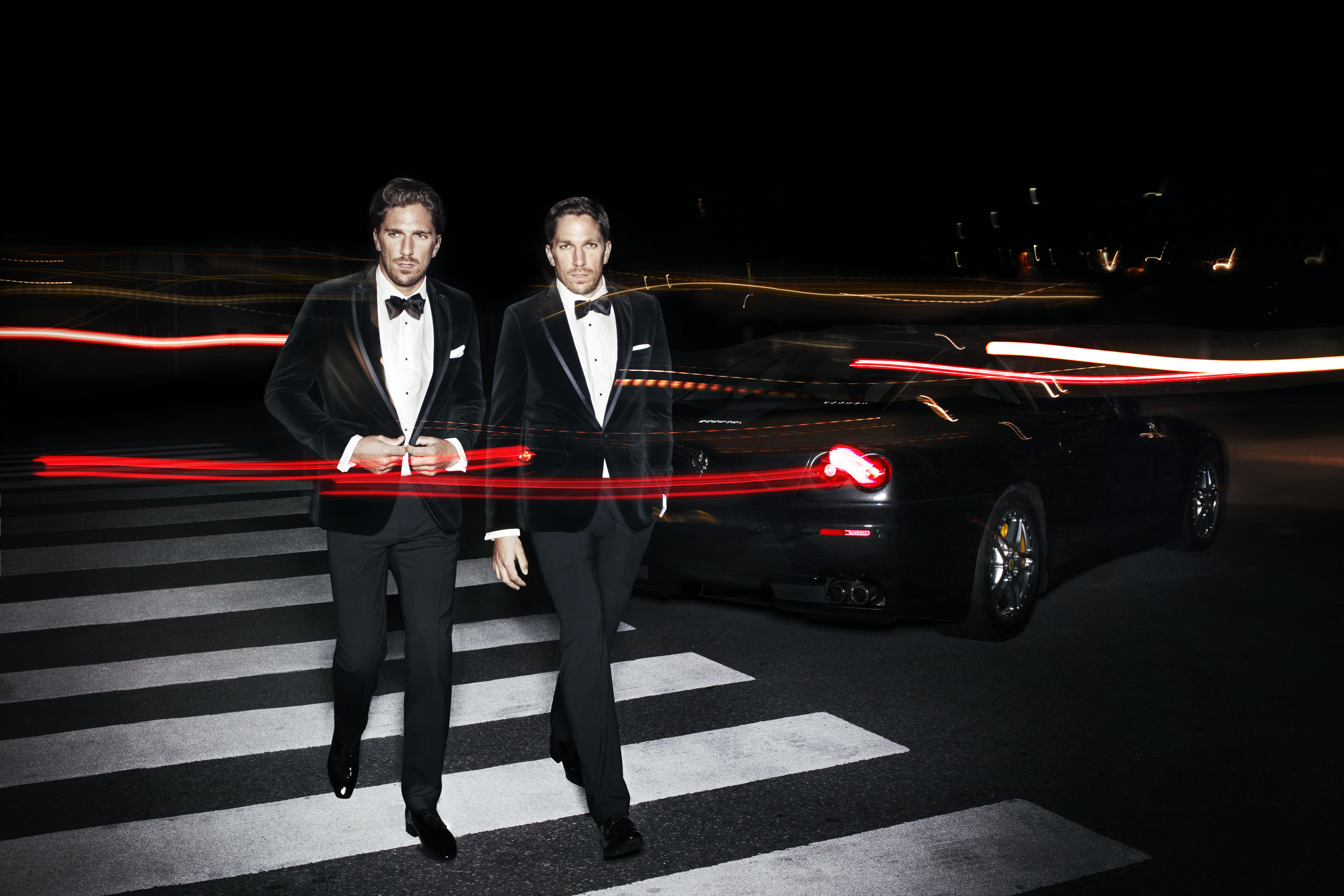
Henrik (left) with his identical twin brother, Joel, during an ad campaign for clothing retailer Brothers

In 2009, Lundqvist became the Rangers spokesman for the Garden of Dreams Foundation, which works mostly with Madison Square Garden and its tenants to host charitable events and grant wishes to sick children, similar to the Make-A-Wish Foundation. In this role, Lundqvist hosts events and records public service messages. In order to benefit the charity, Lundqvist launched a clothing line, called the Crown Collection, on 19 January 2012. The items of the Crown Collection were available exclusively at retail outlets within the confines of Madison Square Garden.

In 2014, Lundqvist and his wife founded the Henrik Lundqvist Foundation a non-profit organization with a focus on health and education for children and families. HLF is an international grantmaking organization, with community partners in New York City, Sweden and the Dominican Republic. The Henrik Lundqvist Foundation hosted its inaugural fundraising event on 14 September 2014, at Refinery Rooftop. The evening included a silent auction, a Q&A session hosted by NHL Network's Kevin Weekes & an acoustic performance by Henrik Lundqvist and bandmate John McEnroe. Lundqvist was named a finalist for the 2014–15 NHL Foundation Player Award for his exemplary work with the Henrik Lundqvist Foundation as well as the Garden of Dreams Foundation. On 29 June 2015, Lundqvist was selected as an athlete finalist for the first ever ESPN Humanitarian of the Year Awards for his commitment to "using the power of sports to transform lives and uplift communities."

=== Hobbies and other ventures ===
In 2004, Lundqvist was awarded "Best Dressed" in Sweden. In April 2006, he was named one of People's World's 100 Most Beautiful People. In December 2008, he was named one of Page Six magazine's Top 25 Best Dressed in 2008.

Lundqvist used to play guitar in a Swedish rock band called Box Play during his time in Frölunda and plays guitar in his spare time.

On 10 July 2013, he hosted the 1.5-hour talk show Sommar on Swedish public radio.

On 13 March 2015, he was honored with the PFLAG National Straight for Equality in Sports Award.

== Broadcast career ==
Lundqvist joined the MSG Network as a studio analyst for New York Rangers coverage in 2021. Also in 2021, he joined TNT as a rotating studio analyst, and was added to their roster full-time during the 2023–24 season, replacing Rick Tocchet.

== Career statistics ==
=== Regular season and playoffs ===
			Regular season										Playoffs
Season	Team	League	GP	W	L	T	OTL	MIN	GA	SO	GAA	SV%	GP	W	L	MIN	GA	SO	GAA	SV%
1998–99	Västra Frölunda HC	J20	35	—	—	—	—	2,100	95	—	2.73	—	—	—	—	—	—	—	—	—
1999–00	Västra Frölunda HC	J20	30	—	—	—	—	1,726	73	—	2.54	.904	5	4	1	300	7	2	1.40	.925
2000–01	Västra Frölunda HC	J20	19	—	—	—	—	1,140	50	2	2.64	.908	5	—	—	—	—	—	1.97	.927
2000–01	Västra Frölunda HC	SEL	4	—	—	—	—	190	11	0	3.47	.882	—	—	—	—	—	—	—	—
2000–01	IF Mölndal Hockey	SWE.2	7	—	—	—	—	420	29	0	4.22	.868	—	—	—	—	—	—	—	—
2001–02	Västra Frölunda HC	J20	1	1	0	0	—	60	4	0	4.00	.840	—	—	—	—	—	—	—	—
2001–02	Västra Frölunda HC	SEL	20	—	—	—	—	1,152	52	2	2.71	.899	8	8	0	490	18	2	2.21	.931
2002–03	Västra Frölunda HC	SEL	28	—	—	—	—	1,650	40	6	1.45	.948	12	—	—	740	26	2	2.11	.922
2003–04	Västra Frölunda HC	SEL	48	—	—	—	—	2,897	105	7	2.17	.928	10	—	—	610	20	0	1.97	.936
2004–05	Frölunda HC	SEL	44	30	8	3	—	2,642	79	6	1.79	.936	14	12	2	855	15	6	1.05	.961
2005–06	New York Rangers	NHL	53	30	12	—	9	3,112	116	2	2.24	.922	3	0	3	177	13	0	4.41	.835
2006–07	New York Rangers	NHL	70	37	22	—	8	4,108	160	5	2.34	.917	10	6	4	637	22	1	2.07	.924
2007–08	New York Rangers	NHL	72	37	24	—	10	4,304	160	10	2.23	.912	10	5	5	608	26	1	2.57	.909
2008–09	New York Rangers	NHL	70	38	25	—	7	4,153	168	4	2.43	.916	7	3	4	380	19	1	3.00	.908
2009–10	New York Rangers	NHL	73	35	27	—	10	4,204	167	4	2.38	.921	—	—	—	—	—	—	—	—
2010–11	New York Rangers	NHL	68	36	27	—	5	4,007	152	11	2.28	.923	5	1	4	346	13	0	2.25	.917
2011–12	New York Rangers	NHL	62	39	18	—	5	3,754	123	8	1.97	.930	20	10	10	1251	38	3	1.82	.931
2012–13	New York Rangers	NHL	43	24	16	—	3	2,575	88	2	2.05	.926	12	5	7	756	27	3	2.14	.934
2013–14	New York Rangers	NHL	63	33	24	—	5	3,655	144	5	2.36	.920	25	13	11	1516	54	1	2.14	.927
2014–15	New York Rangers	NHL	46	30	13	—	3	2,743	103	5	2.25	.922	19	11	8	1166	41	0	2.11	.928
2015–16	New York Rangers	NHL	65	35	21	—	7	3,773	156	4	2.48	.920	5	1	3	205	15	0	4.39	.867
2016–17	New York Rangers	NHL	57	31	20	—	4	3,241	148	2	2.74	.910	12	6	6	775	29	1	2.25	.927
2017–18	New York Rangers	NHL	63	26	26	—	7	3,503	174	2	2.98	.915	—	—	—	—	—	—	—	—
2018–19	New York Rangers	NHL	52	18	23	—	10	3,089	158	0	3.07	.907	—	—	—	—	—	—	—	—
2019–20	New York Rangers	NHL	30	10	12	—	3	1,597	84	1	3.16	.905	2	0	2	119	7	0	3.53	.901
SEL totals			144	—	—	—	—	8,531	287	21	1.99	.929	44	—	—	2,695	79	10	1.76	.939
NHL totals			887	459	310	—	96	51,816	2,101	64	2.43	.918	130	61	67	7,935	304	10	2.30	.921

=== International ===
Year	Team	Event	GP	W	L	T	MIN	GA	SO	GAA	SV%
2000	Sweden	WJC18	4	—	—	—	240	9	0	2.25	.939
2001	Sweden	WJC	7	3	4	0	419	13	0	1.86	.928
2002	Sweden	WJC	7	3	2	2	419	15	1	2.15	.906
2004	Sweden	WC	8	5	2	1	476	13	1	1.64	.925
2005	Sweden	WC	9	6	3	0	510	20	1	2.35	.894
2006	Sweden	OLY	6	5	1	0	360	14	0	2.33	.907
2008	Sweden	WC	5	3	2	—	283	14	0	2.97	.911
2010	Sweden	OLY	3	2	1	—	179	4	2	1.34	.927
2014	Sweden	OLY	6	5	1	—	360	9	2	1.50	.943
2016	Sweden	WCH	3	1	2	—	187	7	1	2.24	.940
2017	Sweden	WC	5	5	0	—	320	7	0	1.31	.946
2019	Sweden	WC	6	4	2	—	359	17	1	2.84	.887
Senior totals			51	36	14	1	3034	105	8	2.08	.917

== Records ==
=== Elitserien records ===
- Goals against average (1.45) and save percentage (.948) in 2002–03
- Goals against average (1.79) and save percentage (.936) in 2004–05

=== New York Rangers/NHL records ===
- Only goaltender in NHL history to record 30 wins in each of first seven seasons
- First NHL goaltender to start his career with 11 straight, 20-win seasons, and became overall the 15th NHL goaltender to have won at least 20 games in a season 11 times
- Most shutouts by a goaltender in Madison Square Garden
- New York Rangers club record, games played, single season: 73 (2009–10)
- The Rangers all-time leader in shutouts (regular season and playoffs combined): 74
- Most wins (459) by a New York Rangers goaltender
- Fastest goaltender to record 400 wins in NHL history
- Most shutouts (64) by a New York Rangers goaltender
- Most Playoffs wins (61) by a New York Rangers goaltender
- Consecutive game 7 wins (6)
- Most combined games played (985)
- Most combined regular season and playoff saves
- Most wins by a European-born goaltender in NHL history
- Most saves in the shootout by a goaltender (career)
- First goaltender in NHL history with consecutive 50+ save wins (since shots were first tracked in the 1955–56 season). Announced during a broadcast on 3 March 2018, he had 100 saves on 106 shots in the last two games played

=== Olympics records ===
- Winter Olympics record for consecutive minutes without allowing a goal: 172 minutes and 34 seconds (2006 to 2010)

== Awards ==
=== Elitserien awards ===
Award	Year(s) awarded
Junior Hockey Player of the Year	2002
Honken Trophy	2003, 2004, 2005
Guldhjälmen	2005
Guldpucken	2005

=== NHL/New York Rangers awards ===
Award	Year(s) awarded
NHL All-Rookie Team	2006
Steven McDonald Extra Effort Award	2006, 2018
New York Rangers' MVP	2007, 2008, 2009, 2010, 2011, 2012, 2013, 2016, 2018
Victoria Cup – New York Rangers	2008
John Halligan Good Guy Award	2008
NHL All-Star Game	2009, 2011, 2012, 2018, 2019
Vezina Trophy	2012
NHL first All-Star team	2012
NHL second All-Star team	2013
NHL All-Decade 2nd Team	2010s

=== International ===
Award	Year(s) awarded
WC Best Goaltender	2004
WC All-Star team	2004
Olympic All-Star team	2014
IIHF All-Time Sweden Team	2020
IIHF Hall of Fame	2025

== See also ==
- List of family relations in the NHL

Awards and achievements
Preceded by Stefan Liv	Honken Trophy; 2003, 2004, 2005	Succeeded by Johan Holmqvist
Preceded by Magnus Kahnberg	Guldhjälmen; 2005	Succeeded by Andreas Karlsson
Preceded by Johan Davidsson	Guldpucken; 2005	Succeeded by Kenny Jönsson
Preceded by Jed Ortmeyer	Steven McDonald Extra Effort Award; 2006	Succeeded by Jed Ortmeyer
Preceded by Tim Thomas	Winner of the Vezina Trophy; 2012	Succeeded by Sergei Bobrovsky
