= Finland men's national inline hockey team =

- Nickname: Rullaleijonat ('Roller Lions')
- Association: Finnish Ice Hockey Association

Biggest win
- Finland 47–0 Chile (2000)

IIHF World Championship
- Appearances: 20 (first in 1996)
- Best result: (gold) (4; 2000, 2001, 2003, 2014)

Finland men's national inline hockey team
Medal record

Men's inline hockey

IIHF World Championship
Gold medal – first place	2000 Czech Republic	
Gold medal – first place	2001 United States	
Gold medal – first place	2003 Germany	
Gold medal – first place	2014 Czech Republic	
Silver medal – second place	2002 Germany	
Silver medal – second place	2004 Germany	
Silver medal – second place	2005 Finland	
Silver medal – second place	2007 Sweden	
Silver medal – second place	2015 Finland	
Silver medal – second place	2017 Slovakia	
Bronze medal – third place	1996 United States	
Bronze medal – third place	1998 United States	
Bronze medal – third place	2006 Hungary	
Bronze medal – third place	2012 Germany	

The Finnish men's national inline hockey team is the national men's inline hockey team for Finland. Finland was one of the most successful teams at the IIHF Inline Hockey World Championships, which were organized during 1996 to 2017 until the tournament was discontinued by the International Ice Hockey Federation (IIHF) in 2019. The tournament was organized annually during 1996 to 2015, with the exception of the year 1999. Starting from 2017, the tournament was to be held every other year but, after being forced to cancel the 2019 edition due to lack of interested hosts, the IIHF voted in June 2019 to end its governance over inline hockey, ending the organization’s involvement in any future inline hockey tournaments. Finland won a total of thirteen medals in nineteen tournaments. At the 2017 IIHF Inline Hockey World Championship in Bratislava, the final tournament organized by the IIHF, the team finished in second place.

== World Championship results by year ==
Year	Host	Result
(United States) 1996	Minneapolis & St. Paul, Minnesota	Bronze
(United States) 1997	Anaheim, California	6th
(United States) 1998	Anaheim, California	Bronze
1999	No tournament held	
(Czech Republic) 2000	Hradec Kralové & Choceň	Gold
(United States) 2001	Ellenton, Florida	Gold
(Germany) 2002	Nürnberg & Pfaffenhofen	Silver
(Germany) 2003	Nürnberg & Amberg	Gold
(Germany) 2004	Bad Tölz	Silver
(Finland) 2005	Kuopio	Silver
(Hungary) 2006	Budapest	Bronze
(Germany) 2007	Landshut & Passau	Silver
(Slovakia) 2008	Bratislava	6th
(Germany) 2009	Ingolstadt	4th
(Sweden) 2010	Karlstad	6th
(Czech Republic) 2011	Pardubice	5th
(Germany) 2012	Ingolstadt	Bronze
(Germany) 2013	Dresden	7th
(Czech Republic) 2014	Pardubice	Gold
(Finland) 2015	Tampere	Silver
(Slovakia) 2017	Bratislava	Silver
(Canada) 2019	Tournament permanently cancelled	

Source: IIHF
