= Great Britain men's national inline hockey team =

National sports team

Medal record

Men's Inline Hockey

World Championships
Gold medal – first place	2004 – Bad Tolz	Division I
Bronze medal – third place	2005 – Kuopio	Division I
Gold medal – first place	2006 – Budapest	Division I
Silver medal – second place	2008 – Bratislava	Division I

The British men's national inline hockey team that participates in the IIHF Inline Hockey World Championships is an independent body established to operate for the sole purpose of operating a team at the World Championships and developing talent for future entries.

== History ==
The national team has won two gold medals in Division I, ranking 9th in the World in 2004, 2006 and narrowly missed out on promotion to the elite division of eight in 2007.

== World Championship results by year ==
- 2003 – Finished 13th
- 2004 – Finished 9th – won Division I gold medal
- 2005 – Finished 12th – won Division I bronze medal
- 2006 – Finished 9th – won Division I gold medal
- 2007 – Finished 13th
- 2008 – Finished 10th – won Division I silver medal
- 2011 – Finished 9th – won Division I gold medal and gained promotion to Pool A
- 2012 – Finished 8th – 1st year in Pool A relegated to Div I
- 2013 – Finished 9th – won Division I gold medal and gained promotion to Pool A
