= Czech Republic men's national inline hockey team =

Men's national ice hockey team representing the Czech Republic

The Czech men's national inline hockey team is the national team for the Czech Republic. The Czechs have won two medals at the IIHF Inline Hockey World Championships, despite the fact that NHL players have frequently been on the team roster. Most recently, the team finished seventh at the 2007 Men's World Inline Hockey Championships.

== 2008 World Championship team ==
Pos.	Player	Team
GK	Ondrej Sturala
GK	Tomas Martin
D	Ludek Broz	(France) Brûleurs de loups
D	Aleš Hemský	(Canada) Edmonton Oilers
D	Vladimir Kames	(Germany) River Rats Geretsried
D	Tomas Mojzis	(United States) Peoria Rivermen
D	Karel Rachůnek	(United States) New Jersey Devils
D	Pavel Strycek	(Czech Republic) HC Blansko
F	Jan Besser	(Czech Republic) HC Berounsti Medvedi
F	Petr Hemský	(Czech Republic) TJ Stadion Kutna Hora
F	Roman Nesrsta	(Germany) ESC Thüringen Erfurt
F	Jiri Polansky	(Czech Republic) HC Trinec
F	Petr Tenkrát	(Sweden) Timrå IK
F	Ladislav Vlcek	(Czech Republic) HC Berounsti Medvedi
F	Martin Vozdecky	(Poland) KH Sanok

== IIHF World Championship results by year ==
- 1996 Minneapolis and St. Paul – 8th place
- 1997 Anaheim – 5th place
- 1998 Bratislava – 10th place (2nd in Group B)
- 1999 no tournament
- 2000 Hradec Kralové and Choceň – Silver Medal (silver)
- 2001 Ellenton – Bronze Medal (bronze)
- 2002 Nürnberg and Pfaffenhofen – 4th place
- 2003 Nürnberg and Amberg – 4th place
- 2004 Bad Tölz – 6th place
- 2005 Kuopio – 4th place
- 2006 Budapest – 5th place
- 2007 Landshut and Passau – 7th place
- 2008 Bratislava – 5th place
- 2009 Ingolstadt – 6th place
- 2010 Karlstadt – Silver Medal (silver)
- 2011 Pardubice – Gold Medal (gold)
- 2012 Ingolstadt – 6th place
- 2013 Dresden – 5th place
- 2014 Pardubice – 5th place
- 2015 Tampere – 6th place
- 2016 no tournament
- 2017 Bratislava – Bronze Medal (bronze)

== FIRS World Championship results by year ==
- 1995 Chicago – 5th place
- 1996 Roccaraso – not participated
- 1997 Zell am See – 4th place
- 1998 Winnipeg – Bronze Medal (bronze)
- 1999 Thun, Wichtrach – Bronze Medal (bronze)
- 2000 Amiens – Bronze Medal (bronze)
- 2001 Torrevieja – Silver Medal (silver)
- 2002 Rochester – Bronze Medal (bronze)
- 2003 Písek – Silver Medal (silver)
- 2004 London – 4th place
- 2005 Paris – Silver Medal (silver)
- 2006 Detroit – Silver Medal (silver)
- 2007 Bilbao – Gold Medal (gold)
- 2008 Ratingen – Bronze Medal (bronze)
- 2009 Varese – Bronze Medal (bronze)
- 2010 Beroun – Bronze Medal (bronze)
- 2011 Roccaraso – Gold Medal (gold)
- 2012 Bucaramanga – Bronze Medal (bronze)
- 2013 Anaheim – Gold Medal (gold)
- 2014 Toulouse – Silver Medal (silver)
- 2015 Rosario – Gold Medal (gold)
- 2016 Asiago, Roana – Gold Medal (gold)
- 2017 Nanjing – Bronze Medal (bronze)
- 2018 Asiago, Roana – Gold Medal (gold)

== World Games results by year ==
- 2005 Duisburg – 5th place
- 2009 Kaohsiung – Bronze Medal (bronze)
- 2013 Cali – Bronze Medal (bronze)
- 2017 Wrocław – Gold Medal (gold)
