= Sweden men's national inline hockey team =

National sports team

Medal record

Men's Inline Hockey

World Championships
Gold medal – first place	2002 - Nürnberg	Top Division
Silver medal – second place	2003 - Nürnberg	Top Division
Bronze medal – third place	2004 - Bad Tolz	Top Division
Gold medal – first place	2005 - Kuopio	Top Division
Silver medal – second place	2006 - Budapest	Top Division
Gold medal – first place	2007 - Landshut	Top Division
Gold medal – first place	2008 - Bratislava	Top Division
Gold medal – first place	2009 - Ingolstadt	Top Division
Bronze medal – third place	2010 - Karlstad	Top Division

The Swedish men's national inline hockey team is one of the most successful inline hockey teams in the world. With notable alumni like Henrik Lundqvist the Swedes have won five gold medals as members of the Top Division at the IIHF Inline Hockey World Championships.

== 2008 World Championship roster ==
Goaltenders
#		Player	Catches	Height	Weight	D.O.B.	Birthplace	Club
1	(Sweden)	Dennis Karlsson	L	1.77 m	78 kg	Jun. 11, 1987	Sweden	(Sweden) Ulricehamns IF (D1)
35	(Sweden)	Kristoffer Martin	L	1.76 m	83 kg	Feb. 17, 1979	Sweden	(Sweden) Göteborgs IK
Defensemen
#		Player	Shoots	Height	Weight	D.O.B.	Birthplace	Club
2	(Sweden)	Johan Lilja	L	1.87 m	93 kg	May 26, 1980	Köping, Sweden	(Sweden) Skå IK (D1)
7	(Sweden)	Daniel Brolin – C	L	1.81 m	88 kg	Jul. 23, 1981	Sweden	(Sweden) Bäcken HC (D3)
18	(Sweden)	Simon Olsson	L	1.70 m	69 kg	Apr. 23, 1989	Gothenburg, Sweden	(United States) Chicago Steel (USHL)
21	(Sweden)	Anders Torgersson	L	1.87 m	87 kg	Feb. 11, 1984	Sweden	(France) Chamonix HC (FLM)
23	(Sweden)	Ludvig Rantanen	R	1.85 m	85 kg	Mar. 23, 1988	Sweden	(Sweden) Frölunda HC (J20)
29	(Sweden)	Andreas Svensson	L	1.85 m	85 kg	Apr. 13, 1980	Karlskrona, Sweden	(Sweden) Olofströms IK (D1)
72	(Sweden)	Martin Thelander	L	1.83 m	80 kg	May 15, 1981	Karlstad, Sweden	(Norway) Storhamar Dragons (NPL)
Forwards
#		Player	Shoots	Height	Weight	D.O.B.	Birthplace	Club
4	(Sweden)	Dave Lindarv	L	1.85 m	85 kg	Jan. 5, 1988	Sweden	(Sweden) Huddinge IK (SHA)
9	(Sweden)	Fredrik Eriksson	L	1.83 m	87 kg	Jul. 17, 1983	Örebro, Sweden	(Sweden) Malmö IF Redhawks (SHA)
12	(Sweden)	Carl Berglund	L	1.75 m	75 kg	Oct. 9, 1989	Sweden	(Sweden) Karlskoga HC (D2)
14	(Sweden)	Dick Axelsson	L	1.90 m	84 kg	Apr. 25, 1987	Sweden	(Sweden) Djurgårdens IF (SEL)
17	(Sweden)	Jonas Karlsson	L	1.80 m	80 kg	Feb. 14, 1986	Sweden
20	(Sweden)	Kristian Luukkonen	L	1.79 m	81 kg	Nov. 3, 1984	Sweden	(Sweden) Kungälvs IK (D1)
24	(Sweden)	Daniel Wessner	L	1.84 m	84 kg	Jan. 22, 1982	Filipstad, Sweden	(Norway) Sparta Sarpsborg (NPL)
26	(Sweden)	Jonas Olsson	L	1.84 m	82 kg	Jul. 2, 1985	Sweden
28	(Sweden)	Linus Klasen	L	1.75 m	72 kg	Feb. 19, 1986	Stockholm, Sweden	(Sweden) Södertälje SK (SEL)
