= Slovakia men's national inline hockey team =

National sports team

Medal record

Men's Inline Hockey

World Championships
Gold medal – first place	2012 - Ingolstadt	Division I
Silver medal – second place	2008 - Bratislava	Top Division

The Slovakia men's national inline hockey team is the national team for the Slovakia. Most recently, the team won the silver medal at the 2008 Men's World Inline Hockey Championships.

== World Championship results by year ==
- 2004 – 5th place
- 2005 –
- 2006 – 6th place
- 2007 – 8th place
- 2008 – Silver Medal
- 2009 – 8th place
- 2010 – 8th place
- 2011 – 8th place
- 2012 – Gold Medal – Division I
- 2013 – 4th place
- 2014 – 7th place
- 2015 – 4th place
- 2017 –
