= United States men's national inline hockey team =

United States
- Nickname: Team U.S.A.
- Association: USA Hockey (IIHF Now cancelled); USA Roller Sports (FIRS/World Skate)
- Team colors
- FIRS code: USA

FIRS World Championship
- Appearances: 18 (first in 1995)
- Best result: Gold: 14 – 1995, 1996, 1997, 1998, 2000, 2001, 2003, 2004, 2005, 2006, 2008, 2009, 2010, 2012; Silver: 2 – 1999, 2002; Bronze: 1 – 2011

United States men's national inline hockey team
Medal record

Men's IIHF InLine World Championship
Gold medal – first place	1996 - Minneapolis	Top Division
Gold medal – first place	1997 - Anaheim	Top Division
Silver medal – second place	1998 - Anaheim	Top Division
Bronze medal – third place	2000 - Hradec Kralové	Top Division
Silver medal – second place	2001 - Ellenton	Top Division
Bronze medal – third place	2003 - Nürnberg	Top Division
Gold medal – first place	2004 - Bad Tolz	Top Division
Bronze medal – third place	2005 - Kuopio	Top Division
Gold medal – first place	2006 - Budapest	Top Division
Silver medal – second place	2009 - Ingolstadt	Top Division
Gold medal – first place	2010 - Karlstad	Top Division
Silver medal – second place	2011 Pardubice	Top Division
Gold medal – first place	2013 Dresden	Top Division
Bronze medal – third place	2014 Pardubice	Top Division
Gold medal – first place	2017 Bratislava	Top Division

FIRS World Championship
Gold medal – first place	1995 USA	Senior Men's
Gold medal – first place	1996 Italy	Senior Men's
Gold medal – first place	1997 Austria	Senior Men's
Gold medal – first place	1998 Canada	Senior Men's
Silver medal – second place	1999 Switzerland	Senior Men's
Gold medal – first place	2000 France	Senior Men's
Gold medal – first place	2001 Spain	Senior Men's
Silver medal – second place	2002 USA	Senior Men's
Gold medal – first place	2003 Czech Republic	Senior Men's
Gold medal – first place	2004 Canada	Senior Men's
Gold medal – first place	2005 France	Senior Men's
Gold medal – first place	2006 USA	Senior Men's
Gold medal – first place	2008 Germany	Senior Men's
Gold medal – first place	2009 Italy	Senior Men's
Gold medal – first place	2010 Czech Republic	Senior Men's
Bronze medal – third place	2011 Italy	Senior Men's
Gold medal – first place	2012 Colombia	Senior Men's
Gold medal – first place	2014 France	Senior Men's
Bronze medal – third place	2015 Argentina	Senior Men's

World Skate - World Championship
Gold medal – first place	2019 Spain	Senior Men's
Bronze medal – third place	2022 Argentina	Senior Men's
Gold medal – first place	2024 Italy	Senior Men's

World Games
Gold medal – first place	2005 Germany	Senior Men's
Gold medal – first place	2009 Taiwan	Senior Men's
Gold medal – first place	2013 Colombia	Senior Men's
Gold medal – first place	2022 United States	Senior Men's
Gold medal – first place	2024 China	Senior Men's

The United States men's national inline hockey team is based out of Lincoln, Nebraska and is controlled by USA Roller Sports. The team competes in all World Skate World Championships and events and the World Games. IIHF InLine Hockey World Championships is now cancelled but was controlled by USA Hockey.

== Roster ==
(2024 World Skate Games)

Goalies
#	Player	Team	Birthplace
33	Troy Redmann	(United States) CarShield	California
30	Michael Maczysnki	(United States) Unify Konixx Black Ice	New Jersey
Defensemen
#	Player	Team	Birthplace
7	Scott Savage	(United States) PAMA Labeda Golden Knights	California
12	Corey Hodge	(United States) CarShield	Michigan
14	Nathan Sigmund	(United States) Mission Labeda Snipers	California
18	Joseph DiMartino	(United States) Tour Road Runners	New York
55	PJ DiMartino	(United States) Unify Konixx Black Ice	New York
68	Max Halvorsen	(United States) Tour Road Runners	New Jersey
Forwards
#	Player	Team	Birthplace
0	Itan Chavira	(United States) PAMA Labeda Golden Knights	California
4	Nicholas DellaMorte	(United States) Tour Road Runners	New York
9	Travis Noe	(United States) PAMA Labeda Golden Knights	California
16	Tyler Kraft	(United States) Unify Konixx Black Ice	Pennsylvania
61	Garret Ross	(United States) CarShield	Michigan
93	William Pascalli	(United States) Unify Konixx Black Ice	Pennsylvania
Coaching Staff
Name	Team	Birthplace
Tim McManus	(United States) Mission Labeda Snipers	New York
Greg Thompson	(United States) Mission Labeda Snipers	New York
Dan Maxwell	(United States) Tour OC Blades	Pennsylvania
Dave Reskey	(United States) Mission Next Gen	California
