= Germany men's national inline hockey team =

Medal record

Men's Inline Hockey

World Championships
Bronze medal – third place	2002 – Nürnberg	Top Division
Bronze medal – third place	2007 – Landshut	Top Division
Bronze medal – third place	2008 – Bratislava	Top Division
Bronze medal – third place	2009 – Ingolstadt	Top Division

The German men's national inline hockey team is the national team for Germany. Most recently, the team won the bronze medal at the 2007 Men's World Inline Hockey Championships. The current head coach is Georg Holzmann.

== 2008 World Championship team ==
The following players were named to the 2008 German national inline hockey team.

Pos.	Player	Team
GK	Jochen Vollmer	(Germany) EHC München
GK	Thomas Ower	(Germany) Frankfurt Lions
D	Josef Kottmair	(Germany) EHC Freiburg
D	Marian Bazany	(Germany) Düsseldorfer EG
D	Florian Zeller	(Germany) EC Bad Tölz
D	Lukas Slavetinsky	(Germany) Schwenninger Wild Wings
D	Steffen Tolzer	(Germany) Augsburger Panther
D	Henrik Hölscher	(Germany) Krefeld Pinguine
D	Jan Schinköthe	(Germany) Deggendorf Fire
F	Christian Wichert	(Germany) EC Peiting
F	Stefan Wichert	Weisswasser
F	Patrick Reimer	(Germany) Düsseldorfer EG
F	Alexander Leinsle	(Germany) EV Germering
F	Michael Wolf	(Germany) Iserlohn Roosters
F	Thomas Greilinger	(Germany) Deggendorf Fire
F	Daniel Huhn	(Germany) EV Landsberg
F	Daniel Menge	(Germany) ESC Dresden
