= World Skate Inline Hockey World Championships =

Annual roller inline hockey tournament

- Current season, competition or edition: 2026 FIRS World Inline Hockey Championships
- Sport: Inline hockey
- Founded: 1995; 31 years ago
- No. of teams: 8 in Group 1 Open in Group 2
- Continent: International (WS)
- Most recent champions: United States (men); United States (women)
- Most titles: United States (men; 17 titles); United States (women; 11 titles)
- Website: worldskate.org

The Inline Hockey World Championship is an annual inline hockey tournament organized by World Skate. Prior to the creation of World Skate in September 2017, the championship was administrated by the Comité International Roller In-Line Hockey (CIRILH), an organization and discipline of Fédération Internationale de Roller Sports (FIRS). It is the sport's highest-profile annual international tournament.

2017, 2019 and since 2022 editions are part of World Skate Games.

== History ==
The first tournament was held in Chicago, United States in 1995. The United States won the tournament after defeating Canada in the final. The United States won the tournament a further three times before in 1999 they were beaten by Switzerland in the gold medal game. The following year the United States reclaimed the gold medal and again won it in 2001.

In 2002 FIRS expanded the inline program to include a women's tournament. Both the men's and women's tournaments were held in Rochester, New York, United States where Canada's men's and women's teams went on to win their respective tournaments. Through the next four years the United States continued their dominance in the men's tournament while in the women's both Canada and the United States competed in the final all four times by both winning two gold medals each.

In 2007 FIRS again expanded their inline program to include a men's junior tournament. The United States went on to win the first edition of the tournament after beating the Czech Republic in the final.

Due to the 2022 Russian invasion of Ukraine, World Skate banned Russian and Belarusian athletes and officials from its competitions, and will not stage any events in Russia or Belarus in 2022.

== Tournament results ==
=== Senior men ===
Year	(gold) Gold	(silver) Silver	(bronze) Bronze	Host city (cities)	Host country
1995	United States	Canada	Finland	Chicago	United States
1996	United States	France	Italy	Roccaraso	Italy
1997	United States	Canada	Austria	Zell am See	Austria
1998	United States	Austria	Czech Republic	Winnipeg	Canada
1999	Switzerland	United States	Czech Republic	Thun, Wichtrach	Switzerland
2000	United States	Switzerland	Czech Republic	Amiens	France
2001	United States	Czech Republic	Switzerland	Torrevieja	Spain
2002	Canada	United States	Czech Republic	Rochester	United States
2003	United States	Czech Republic	Canada	Písek	Czech Republic
2004	United States	Canada	Italy	London	Canada
2005	United States	Czech Republic	France	Paris	France
2006	United States	Czech Republic	Canada	Detroit	United States
2007	Czech Republic	Switzerland	Canada	Bilbao	Spain
2008	United States	France	Czech Republic	Ratingen	Germany
2009	United States	Canada	Czech Republic	Varese	Italy
2010	United States	Switzerland	Czech Republic	Beroun	Czech Republic
2011	Czech Republic	Italy	United States	Roccaraso	Italy
2012	United States	Canada	Czech Republic	Bucaramanga	Colombia
2013	Czech Republic	Canada	Switzerland	Anaheim	United States
2014	United States	Czech Republic	Canada	Toulouse	France
2015	Czech Republic	France	United States	Rosario	Argentina
2016	Czech Republic	Italy	France	Asiago, Roana	Italy
2017	France	Italy	Czech Republic	Nanjing	China
2018	Czech Republic	France	Switzerland	Asiago, Roana	Italy
2019	United States	Czech Republic	France	Barcelona	Spain
2021	Czech Republic	Canada	Spain	Roccaraso	Italy
2022	Czech Republic	Italy	United States	Buenos Aires, San Juan	Argentina
2024	United States	Czech Republic	Italy	Roccaraso	Italy
2026	France	Czech Republic	United States	Asunción	Paraguay

=== Medal table ===
Country	(gold) Gold	(silver) Silver	(bronze) Bronze	Medals
United States	17	2	4	21
Czech Republic	8	8	9	24
Canada	1	7	4	12
France	2	4	3	8
Switzerland	1	3	3	7
Italy	0	4	3	7
Austria	0	1	1	2
Spain	0	0	1	1
Finland	0	0	1	1

=== Senior women ===
Year	(gold) Gold	(silver) Silver	(bronze) Bronze	Host city (cities)	Host country
2002	Canada	United States	Australia	Rochester	United States
2003	United States	Canada	Czech Republic	Písek	Czech Republic
2004	Canada	United States	Czech Republic	London	Canada
2005	Canada	United States	France	Paris	France
2006	United States	Canada	France	Detroit	United States
2007	United States	Czech Republic	France	Bilbao	Spain
2008	Czech Republic	Canada	United States	Düsseldorf	Germany
2009	United States	Czech Republic	Canada	Varese	Italy
2010	Czech Republic	Canada	United States	Beroun	Czech Republic
2011	United States	Canada	France	Roccaraso	Italy
2012	Canada	United States	Spain	Bucaramanga	Colombia
2013	United States	Canada	New Zealand	Anaheim	United States
2014	United States	Canada	Spain	Toulouse	France
2015	Czech Republic	United States	Spain	Rosario	Argentina
2016	Canada	United States	France	Asiago, Roana	Italy
2017	United States	Spain	Canada	Nanjing	China
2018	United States	Czech Republic	Spain	Asiago, Roana	Italy
2019	United States	Czech Republic	Spain	Barcelona	Spain
2021	France	Spain	United States	Roccaraso	Italy
2022	Spain	France	United States	Buenos Aires	Argentina
2023	Not Held				
2024	United States	Spain	France	Roccaraso	Italy
2026	Spain	France	United States	Asunción	Paraguay

=== Medal table ===
Country	(gold) Gold	(silver) Silver	(bronze) Bronze	Medals
United States	11	6	5	22
Canada	5	7	2	14
Czech Republic	3	4	2	9
Spain	2	3	5	10
France	1	2	6	9
Australia	0	0	1	1
New Zealand	0	0	1	1

=== Junior men ===
Year	(gold) Gold	(silver) Silver	(bronze) Bronze	Host city (cities)	Host country
2007	United States	Czech Republic	Germany	Düsseldorf	Germany
2008	Great Britain	United States	Canada	Philadelphia	United States
2009	Czech Republic	Canada	United States	Varese	Italy
2010	Czech Republic	United States	France	Düsseldorf	Germany
2011	Czech Republic	United States	France	Roccaraso	Italy
2012	Czech Republic	Colombia	United States	Bucaramanga	Colombia
2013	Czech Republic	United States	Canada	Anaheim	United States
2014	France	Canada	Czech Republic	Toulouse	France
2015	Czech Republic	France	Italy	Rosario	Argentina
2016	Czech Republic	Italy	Switzerland	Asiago, Roana	Italy
2017	France	Spain	Italy	Nanjing	China
2018	United States	Italy	Spain	Asiago, Roana,	Italy
2019	Czech Republic	United States	Spain	Barcelona	Spain
2021	the tournament was not organized			Roccaraso	Italy
2022	Chinese Taipei	United States	Czech Republic	Buenos Aires, San Juan	Argentina
2023	Not Held				
2024	Slovakia	Spain	United States	Roccaraso	Italy
2026	Italy	France	Spain	Asunción	Paraguay

=== Junior women ===
Year	(gold) Gold	(silver) Silver	(bronze) Bronze	Host city (cities)	Host country
2014	Spain	United States	Great Britain	Toulouse	France
2016	Spain	Italy	Canada	Asiago, Roana	Italy
2017	Chinese Taipei	Italy	New Zealand	Nanjing	China
2018	Spain	Finland	Chinese Taipei	Asiago, Roana	Italy
2019	Spain	United States	Canada	Barcelona	Spain
2021	the tournament was not organized			Roccaraso	Italy
2022	Namibia	United States	Colombia	Buenos Aires, San Juan	Argentina
2023	Not Held				
2024	Spain	United States	Namibia	Roccaraso	Italy
2026	Spain	United States	Colombia	Asunción	Paraguay

=== Veteran men ===
Year	(gold) Gold	(silver) Silver	(bronze) Bronze	Host city (cities)	Host country
2010	Czech Republic	France	Italy	Bisley	Great Britain
2011	Czech Republic	France	Italy	Beroun	Czech Republic
2012	France	Czech Republic	Italy	Pinerolo	Italy
2014	Czech Republic	France	Slovakia	Prague	Czech Republic
2015	Czech Republic	Italy	Slovakia	Düsseldorf	Germany
2016	Czech Republic	United States	Switzerland	Bolzano/Merano	Italy

== See also ==
- IIHF Inline Hockey World Championship
