= 2016 FIRS World Inline Hockey Championships =

International sports tournament

Tournament details
- Host country: Italy
- Venues: 2 (in 2 host cities)
- Dates: June 12–25
- Teams: 65 from 28 countries

The 2016 FIRS World Inline Hockey Championships was the 21st event hosted by the Comité International de Roller In-Line Hockey (CIRILH), an organization and discipline of the Fédération Internationale de Roller Sports (FIRS), held in Asiago and Roana in the Veneto region, Italy, between June 12–25, 2016.

The four competitions were played at two venues, 6 kilometres from each other. The Pala Hodegart, which seats 2,200, is located in Asiago. Pala Robaan is located in Roana.

23 teams competed in the senior men's tournament, 17 teams in the senior women's, 18 teams in the junior men's and seven teams in the junior women's. The senior men's tournament began on June 20, 2016, and the senior women's tournament began on June 12 and concluded on June 17 (same as junior men's).

== Medal summary ==
=== Medal table ===
Rank	Nation	Gold	Silver	Bronze	Total
1	Czech Republic (CZE)	2	0	0	2
2	Canada (CAN)	1	0	1	2
3	Spain (ESP)	1	0	0	1
4	Italy (ITA)	0	3	0	3
5	United States (USA)	0	1	0	1
6	France (FRA)	0	0	2	2
7	Switzerland (SUI)	0	0	1	1
Totals (7 entries)		4	4	4	12

=== Medalists ===
Event	Gold	Silver	Bronze
Senior Men's	Czech Republic	Italy	France
Senior Women's	Canada	USA	France
Junior Men's	Czech Republic	Italy	Switzerland
Junior Women's	Spain	Italy	Canada

== Senior Men's tournament ==
=== Participating nations ===
Group 1		Group 2			
Pool A	Pool B	Pool C	Pool D	Pool E	Pool F
Czech Republic; Latvia; Italy; Mexico	France; USA; Spain; Argentina	Switzerland; China; Chinese Taipei	Colombia; Canada; Germany; Sweden	Venezuela; Australia; Great Britain; Poland	Macau; India; Iran; Netherlands

== See also ==
- FIRS Inline Hockey World Championships
- List of FIRS Senior Men's Inline Hockey World Championships medalists
