= 2016 FIRS World Inline Hockey Championships – Senior Men's tournament =

International sports tournament

Tournament details
- Host country: Italy
- Venues: 2 (in 2 host cities)
- Dates: June 20–25
- Teams: 23

Final positions
- Champions: Czech Republic (5th title)
- Runners-up: Italy
- Third place: France
- Fourth place: United States

Tournament statistics
- Games played: 67

The senior men's tournament at the 2016 FIRS World Inline Hockey Championships was the 21st event hosted by the Comité International de Roller In-Line Hockey (CIRILH), an organization and discipline of the Fédération Internationale de Roller Sports (FIRS), held in Asiago and Roana, Veneto region, Italy, between June 20–25, 2016.

The Czech Republic won the team's fifth title in history by defeating Italy in the final 4–0.

== Locations ==
Pala Hodegart Capacity: 2,200	Pala Robaan Capacity: 1,300
(Italy) Asiago	(Italy) Roana

== Format ==
Twenty-three team were divided into six pools. The top eight teams, based on final placement of the 2015 competition, were placed into Pools A and B, each with four teams. The remaining fifteen teams were divided into Pools C, D, E and F one with three teams and the other with four. The teams then played a round-robin within their pools. The best three teams in pools A and B, as well as the top team in pools C, D, E and F, advanced to a single-knockout playoff for the world championship. The remaining teams advanced to the single-knockout for other placement.

== Nations ==
Asia

- China
- Chinese Taipei
- India (Note: 9 through 15 placement in the 2015 World Championship)
- Iran
- Macau

Europe

- Czech Republic (Note: Top 8 placement at the 2015 World Championship)
- Spain
- France
- Germany
- Great Britain
- Italy
- Latvia
- Netherlands
- Poland
- Sweden
- Switzerland

Oceania

- Australia

Pan-America

- Argentina
- Canada
- Colombia
- Mexico
- USA
- Venezuela

== Rosters ==
Each team's roster consisted of at least six skaters (forwards and defencemen) and two goaltenders, and at most 14 skaters and two goaltenders. All twenty-three participating nations, through the confirmation of their respective national associations, had to submit a roster the sign-in date of the tournament.

== Seeding and pools ==
The seeding in the preliminary round is based on the 2015 World Championships. The teams were grouped according to seeding (in parentheses is the corresponding 2015 placement). Top 8 placement was seeded in Level 1.

=== Level 1 ===
Pool A

- Czech Republic (1)
- Latvia (4)
- Italy (5)
- Mexico (8)

Pool B

- France (2)
- USA (3)
- Spain (6)
- Argentina (7)

=== Level 2 ===
Pool C

- Switzerland (10)
- China ‡ 2014
- Chinese Taipei ‡ 2007

Pool D

- Colombia (11)
- Canada ‡ 2014
- Germany ‡ 2014
- Sweden ‡ 2014

Pool E

- Venezuela (12)
- Australia ‡ 2014
- Great Britain ‡ 2014
- Poland ‡ 2014

Pool F

- Macau (14)
- India (15)
- Iran ‡ 2011
- Netherlands ‡ 2008

‡ Last participate championships.

== Round robin ==
=== Pool A ===
Team	Pld	W	L	D	GF	GA	GD	Pts	Qualification
Italy	3	2	0	1	22	7	+15	5	World Championship Quarterfinals round
Czech Republic	3	2	1	0	27	6	+21	4	World Championship Quarterfinals round
Latvia	3	1	1	1	15	16	−1	3	World Championship Quarterfinals round
Mexico	3	0	3	0	6	41	−35	0	9th through 16th placement

All times are local (UTC+1).

June 20, 2016; 1:00 PM	Mexico	0–16 (0–11, 0–5)	Czech Republic	Pala Hodegart, Asiago

Game reference

June 20, 2016; 8:30 PM	Italy	3–3 (1–2, 2–1)	Latvia	Pala Hodegart, Asiago

Game reference

June 21, 2016; 10:00 AM	Latvia	10–5 (6–3, 4–2)	Mexico	Pala Hodegart, Asiago

Game reference

June 21, 2016; 8:30 PM	Czech Republic	3–4 (2–1, 1–3)	Italy	Pala Hodegart, Asiago

Game reference

June 22, 2016; 4:00 PM	Czech Republic	8–2 (2–1, 6–1)	Latvia	Pala Robaan, Roana

Game reference

June 22, 2016; 7:00 PM	Italy	15–1 (9–0, 6–1)	Mexico	Pala Hodegart, Asiago

Game reference

=== Pool B ===
Team	Pld	W	L	D	GF	GA	GD	Pts	Qualification
France	3	3	0	0	13	6	+7	6	World Championship Quarterfinals round
USA	3	1	1	1	8	7	+1	3	World Championship Quarterfinals round
Argentina	3	1	2	0	8	12	−4	2	World Championship Quarterfinals round
Spain	3	0	2	1	4	8	−4	1	9th through 16th placement

All times are local (UTC+1).

June 20, 2016; 2:30 pm	Argentina	4–8 (2–3, 2–5)	France	Pala Hodegart, Asiago

Game reference

June 20, 2016; 7:00 PM	USA	3–3 (1–2, 2–1)	Spain	Pala Hodegart, Asiago

Game reference

June 21, 2016; 2:30 PM	France	3–1 (2–1, 1–0)	Spain	Pala Hodegart, Asiago

Game reference

June 21, 2016; 7:00 PM	USA	4–2 (0–0, 4–2)	Argentina	Pala Hodegart, Asiago

Game reference

June 22, 2016; 2:30 PM	Spain	0–2 (0–0, 0–2)	Argentina	Pala Robaan, Roana

Game reference

June 22, 2016; 4:00 PM	France	2–1 (1–0, 1–1)	USA	Pala Hodegart, Asiago

Game reference

=== Pool C ===
Team	Pld	W	L	D	GF	GA	GD	Pts	Qualification
Switzerland	2	2	0	0	38	3	+35	4	World Championship Pre-quarterfinals round
Chinese Taipei	2	1	1	0	24	10	+14	2	9th through 16th placement
China	2	0	2	0	1	50	−49	0	National Team World Cup

=== Pool D ===
Team	Pld	W	L	D	GF	GA	GD	Pts	Qualification
Canada	3	3	0	0	24	5	+19	6	World Championship Pre-quarterfinals round
Sweden	3	2	1	0	19	12	+7	4	9th through 16th placement
Colombia	3	1	2	0	9	21	−12	2	National Team World Cup
Germany	3	0	3	0	10	24	−14	0	National Team World Cup

=== Pool E ===
Team	Pld	W	L	D	GF	GA	GD	Pts	Qualification
Great Britain	3	3	0	0	17	5	+12	6	World Championship Pre-quarterfinals round
Poland	3	2	1	0	14	6	+8	4	9th through 16th placement
Australia	3	1	2	0	2	19	−17	2	National Team World Cup
Venezuela (Note: Venezuela din not start on the tournament.)	3	0	3	0	0	3	−3	0	

=== Pool F ===
Team	Pld	W	L	D	GF	GA	GD	Pts	Qualification
Iran	3	2	0	1	20	2	+18	5	World Championship Pre-quarterfinals round
Netherlands	3	2	0	1	26	4	+22	5	9th through 16th placement
Macau	3	1	2	0	10	24	−14	2	National Team World Cup
India	3	0	3	0	3	29	−26	0	National Team World Cup

== World Championship ==
Pre-quarterfinals
D1	Canada	8
E1	Great Britain	0
C1	Switzerland	10
F1	Iran	0

Quarterfinals
B2	USA	7
A3	Latvia	2
A1	Italy	4‡
PQ2	Canada	3
A2	Czech Republic	7
B3	Argentina	2
B1	France	5
PQ1	Switzerland	2

Semifinals
QF4	USA	3
QF3	Italy	5
QF2	Czech Republic	3†
QF1	France	2

Final
SF2	Italy	0
SF1	Czech Republic	4
Bronze medal game
SF2	USA	2
SF1	France	5

† Indicates overtime victory
‡ Indicates shootout victory

=== Pre-quarterfinals ===
June 22, 2016; 5:30 PM	Switzerland	10–0 (4–0, 6–0)	Iran	Pala Hodegart, Asiago

Game reference

June 22, 2016; 8:30 AM	Canada	8–0 (6–0, 2–0)	Great Britain	Pala Hodegart, Asiago

Game reference

=== Quarterfinals ===
June 23, 2016; 4:00 PM	USA	7–2 (2–0, 5–2)	Latvia	Pala Hodegart, Asiago

Game reference

Keating (Mosenson) PP – 15:33	1–0
Baldwin (Page) – 17:36	2–0
Keating – 23:59	3–0
Baldwin (Ganz) – 28:27	4–0
Petito (Page) – 29:21	5–0
	5–1	32:14 – Cimermanis (Batraks)
Roux (Cafferty) – 33:06	6–1
	6–2	38:33 – Galkins (Jekimovs)
Mazzie SH – 38:53	7–2

June 23, 2016; 5:30 AM	Czech Republic	7–2 (5–0, 2–2)	Argentina	Pala Hodegart, Asiago

Game reference

Jakub Bernard (Tomas Rubes) PP – 03:52	1–0
Marek Laskot – 13:41	2–0
Tomas Rubes (Jakub Bernard) – 15:36	3–0
Mikulas Zboril (Petr Kafka) – 19:46	4–0
Marek Laskot (Jakub Bernard) – 19:57	5–0
	5–1	20:38 – Facundo Vadra (Sebastian Marengo)
Michal Simo (Marek Laskot) – 28:24	6–1
Jakub Cik (Tomas Rubes) – 36:42	7–1
	7–2	37:35 – Sebastian Echevarría

June 23, 2016; 7:00 AM	France	5–2 (2–1, 3–1)	Switzerland	Pala Hodegart, Asiago

Game reference

	0–1	06:55 – Maier (Schwarzenbach) PP
Fontanille (Vitou) – 16:16	1–1
Crignier – 16:35	2–1
Vitou PP – 20:59	3–1
Langlois (Bouchut) – 27:59	4–1
Hamon (Lapresa) – 31:35	5–1
	5–2	39:59 – Müller (Neukom) PP

June 23, 2016; 8:30 AM	Italy	4–3 GWS (3–0, 0–3 / 0-0, 1–0)	Canada	Pala Hodegart, Asiago

Game reference

Virzi (Ciresa) PP – 00:51	1–0
Ciresa (Ustignani) – 08:10	2–0
Ustignani (Rigoni) PP – 16:22	3–0
	3–1	20:17 – Foote (Sonstelie)
	3–2	23:10 – Furlong (Esdale)
	3–3	31:59 – Matthews (Hammond)
Emanuele Ferrari	4–3

=== Semifinals ===
June 24, 2016; 7:00 PM	Czech Republic	3–2 OT (1–1, 1–1 / 1–0)	France	Pala Hodegart, Asiago

Game reference

Jakub Cik (Mikulas Zboril) – 05:02	1–0
	1–1	10:10 – Maxime Langlois (Théo Fontanille)
	1–2	30:10 – Benjamin Tijou (Karl Gabillet)
Petr Kafka (Jakub Cik) – 36:16	2–2
Jakub Cik (Petr Kafka) – 48:54	3–2

June 24, 2016; 8:30 PM	USA	3–5 (2–3, 1–2)	Italy	Pala Hodegart, Asiago

Game reference

	0–1	02:39 – Lievore (Ustignani)
Cafferty (Roux) – 07:37	1–1
	1–2	10:17 – Rigoni (Belcastro) PP
	1–3	12:39 – Ciresa (Banchero)
Cafferty – 12:55	2–3
Baldwin (Ganz) – 21:42	3–3
	3–4	29:03 – Ferrari (Belcastro)
	3–5	38:39 – Traversa (Baldan) EN

=== Bronze medal game ===
June 25, 2016; 5:00 PM	USA	2–5 (1–1, 1–4)	France	Pala Hodegart, Asiago

Game reference

Vaslet (Mazzie) – 06:32	1–0
	1–1	17:41 – Rage (Langlois) PP
Petito (Roux) – 21:44	2–1
	2–2	23:03 – Gabillet (Rage)
	2–3	27:13 – Gabillet (Rage) PP
	2–4	33:01 – Gabillet (Tijou)
	2–5	34:40 – Gabillet PP

=== Gold medal game ===
June 25, 2016; 8:00 PM	Italy	0–4 (1–1, 1–1 / 1–0)	Czech Republic	Pala Hodegart, Asiago

Game reference

Mai
Goalies
Brabec

0–1	09:21 – Jakub Bernard (Tomas Rubes) PP
0–2	30:21 – Marek Loskot (Petr Kafka) PP
0–3	32:14 – Martin Fiala (David Sebek)
0–4	36:29 – Marek Loskot (Michal Simo)

1 min
Penalties
5 min

== 5th through 8th placement ==
Qualifying round
QF4	Latvia	3
QF3	Canada	5
QF2	Argentina	5
QF1	Switzerland	8

5th place game
Q2	Canada	5
Q1	Switzerland	2
7th place game
Q2	Latvia	3
Q1	Argentina	6

All times are local (UTC+1).

=== 5th place game ===
June 25, 2016; 1:00 PM	Canada	5–2 (1–2, 4–0)	Switzerland	Pala Hodegart, Asiago

Game reference

=== 7th place game ===
June 25, 2016; 11:30 AM	Latvia	3–6 (3–3, 0–3)	Argentina	Pala Hodegart, Asiago

Game reference

== 9th through 16th placement ==
Quarterfinals
B4	Spain	4
D2	Sweden	5
PQ2	Great Britain	7
F2	Netherlands	0
A4	Mexico	3
C2	Chinese Taipei	7
PQ1	Iran	1
E2	Poland	5

Semifinals
QF	Sweden	5
QF	Great Britain	2
QF	Chinese Taipei	1
QF	Poland	5

9th place game
SF2	Sweden	1
SF1	Poland	2
11th place game
SF2	Great Britain	4
SF1	Chinese Taipei	3

All times are local (UTC+1).

=== 9th place game ===
June 25, 2016; 10:00 PM	Sweden	1–2 OT (1–0, 0–1)	Poland	Pala Hodegart, Asiago

Game reference

=== 11th place game ===
June 25, 2016; 10:30 AM	Great Britain	4–3 OT (1–1, 2–2)	Chinese Taipei	Pala Robaan, Roana

Game reference

13th – 16th place play-offs
QF4	Mexico	3
QF3	Iran	4
QF1	Spain	6
QF2	Netherlands	0

13th place game
Q2	Iran	2
Q1	Spain	8
15th place game
Q2	Mexico	3
Q1	Netherlands	7

=== 13th place game ===
June 25, 2016; 3:00 PM	Iran	2–8 (1–3, 1–5)	Spain	Pala Robaan, Roana

Game reference

=== 15th place game ===
June 25, 2016; 1:30 PM	Mexico	3–7 (1–2, 2–5)	Netherlands	Pala Robaan, Roana

Game reference

== 17th through 22nd placement ==
Pre-Round
D4	India	2
E3	China	3
F4	Germany	5
C3	Australia	3

Round 1
PR2	China	3
F3	Macau	6
PR1	Germany	2
D3	Colombia	3

17th place game
R1	Macau	0
R2	Colombia	14
19th place game
R1	China	6
R2	Germany	18

All times are local (UTC+1).

=== 17th place game ===
June 24, 2016; 7:00 PM	Macau	0–14 (0–8, 0–6)	Colombia	Pala Robaan, Roana

Game reference

=== 19th place game ===
June 24, 2016; 2:00 PM	China	6–18 (3–10, 3–8)	Germany	Pala Robaan, Roana

Game reference

=== 21st place game ===
June 24, 2016; 12:30 PM	Australia	16–0 (6–0, 10–0)	India	Pala Robaan, Roana

Game reference

June 25, 2016; 9:00 AM	India	1–21 (1–11, 0–10)	Australia	Pala Robaan, Roana

Game reference

== Final ranking ==
Pos	Team	Mtch	Pts	Final Result
1st place, gold medalist(s)	Czech Republic	6	10	Champions
2nd place, silver medalist(s)	Italy	6	9	Runners-up
3rd place, bronze medalist(s)	France	6	10	Third place
4	USA	6	5	Fourth place
5	Canada	7	12	Eliminated in Quarterfinals
6	Switzerland	6	8	Eliminated in Quarterfinals
7	Argentina	6	2	Eliminated in Quarterfinals
8	Latvia	6	3	Eliminated in Quarterfinals
9	Poland	6	10	9th–16th placement
10	Sweden	6	9	9th–16th placement
11	Great Britain	7	10	Eliminated in Pre-q.
12	Chinese Taipei	5	5	9th–16th placement
13	Spain	6	5	9th–16th placement
14	Iran	7	7	Eliminated in Pre-q.
15	Netherlands	6	7	9th–16th placement
16	Mexico	6	0	9th–16th placement
17	Colombia	5	6	17th–22nd placement
18	Macau	5	4	17th–22nd placement
19	Germany	6	4	17th–22nd placement
20	China	5	2	17th–22nd placement
21	Australia	6	6	17th–22nd placement
22	India	6	0	17th–22nd placement
23	Venezuela	DNS		

== See also ==
- FIRS Inline Hockey World Championships
- List of FIRS Senior Men's Inline Hockey World Championships medalists
