= 2008 FIRS Men's Inline Hockey World Championships =

International sports tournament

Tournament details
- Host country: Germany
- Venue: 1 (in 1 host city)
- Dates: July 6 - July 12
- Teams: 17

The FIRS Men's Inline Hockey World Championships XIV is held in Germany between July 6 and July 12, 2008. It is the 14th such event hosted by the International Roller Sports Federation. Teams representing 17 countries will participate in four pools. The competition will also serve as qualifications for the 2009 competition as well as selection of the five top placing teams for the 2009 World Games.

== Participating teams ==
=== Group 1 ===
Pool A

- Czech Republic
- France
- South Korea
- United States

Pool B

- Canada
- Italy
- Spain
- Switzerland

=== Group 2 ===
Pool C

- Australia
- China
- Great Britain
- Venezuela

Pool D

- Belgium
- Germany
- Iran
- Mexico
- Netherlands

== Rules ==
For standing purposes, points shall be awarded as follows:

- 2 points for a win
- 1 point for a tie
- No points for a loss

If teams are tied in a standing based on points, the following tie-breakers are applied: 1) The most points earned in direct games involving tied teams. 2) The best goal differential in direct games involving tied teams. 3) The most goal scored in direct games involving tied teams. 4) Follow steps 1, 2 and 3 with games involving the highest non-tied team in the same group. 5) Repeat step 4 with games involving the second highest non-tied team in the same group. 6) Continue this process with all non-tied team games.

== Group 1 ==
The top eight inline hockey nations were placed in the following two pools. After playing a round robin, the top three teams in each pool advance to the World Championship while the last team in each pool are relegated to the National Team World Cup.

=== Pool A ===
Team	Pld	W	L	D	GF	GA	GD	Pts
y – Czech Republic	3	2	0	1	29	7	+22	5
y – United States	3	2	0	1	23	9	+14	5
y – France	3	1	2	0	15	13	+2	2
x – South Korea	3	0	3	0	3	41	−38	0

x – Team sent to the National Team World Cup; y – Team advanced to the World Championship

All times are local (UTC+2).

July 6, 2008; 12:30	Czech Republic	19 – 2	South Korea	Eissporthalle, Ratingen, Germany

July 6, 2008; 15:30	France	5 – 6	United States	Eissporthalle, Ratingen, Germany

July 7, 2008; 17:00	United States	14 – 1	South Korea	Eissporthalle, Ratingen, Germany

July 7, 2008; 20:00	Czech Republic	7 – 2	France	Eissporthalle, Ratingen, Germany

July 8, 2008; 14:00	France	8 – 0	South Korea	Eissporthalle, Ratingen, Germany

July 8, 2008; 18:30	Czech Republic	3 – 3	United States	Eissporthalle, Ratingen, Germany

=== Pool B ===
Team	Pld	W	L	D	GF	GA	GD	Pts
y – Canada	3	3	0	0	33	5	+28	6
y – Switzerland	3	2	1	0	19	7	+12	4
y – Italy	3	0	2	1	6	27	−21	1
x – Spain	3	0	2	1	4	23	−19	1

x – Team sent to the National Team World Cup; y – Team advanced to the World Championship

All times are local (UTC+2).

July 6, 2008; 14:00	Switzerland	8 – 1	Spain	Eissporthalle, Ratingen, Germany

July 6, 2008; 20:00	Canada	16 – 2	Italy	Eissporthalle, Ratingen, Germany

July 7, 2008; 12:30	Switzerland	2 – 4	Canada	Eissporthalle, Ratingen, Germany

July 7, 2008; 14:00	Italy	2 – 2	Spain	Eissporthalle, Ratingen, Germany

July 8, 2008; 15:30	Canada	13 – 1	Spain	Eissporthalle, Ratingen, Germany

July 8, 2008; 20:00	Switzerland	9 – 2	Italy	Eissporthalle, Ratingen, Germany

== Group 2 ==
The remaining inline hockey nations were placed in the following two pools. After playing a round robin, the top team in each pool advance to the World Championship while the rest of the teams in each pool are relegated to the National Team World Cup.

=== Pool C ===
Team	Pld	W	L	D	GF	GA	GD	Pts
y – China	3	2	1	0	25	8	+17	4
x – Great Britain	3	2	1	0	20	8	+12	4
x – Australia	3	2	1	0	18	10	+8	4
x – Venezuela	3	0	3	0	4	41	−37	0

x – Team sent to the National Team World Cup; y – Team advanced to the World Championship

All times are local (UTC+2).

July 6, 2008; 9:30	Australia	3 – 5	China	Eissporthalle, Ratingen, Germany

July 6, 2008; 11:00	Great Britain	13 – 1	Venezuela	Eissporthalle, Ratingen, Germany

July 7, 2008; 9:30	China	18 – 2	Venezuela	Eissporthalle, Ratingen, Germany

July 7, 2008; 11:00	Great Britain	4 – 5	Australia	Eissporthalle, Ratingen, Germany

July 8, 2008; 9:30	Australia	10 – 1	Venezuela	Eissporthalle, Ratingen, Germany

July 8, 2008; 11:00	Great Britain	3 – 2	China	Eissporthalle, Ratingen, Germany

=== Pool D ===
Team	Pld	W	L	D	GF	GA	GD	Pts
y – Germany	4	4	0	0	25	8	+17	8
x – Netherlands	4	3	1	0	28	13	+15	6
x – Mexico	4	2	2	0	29	14	+15	4
x – Belgium	4	1	3	0	14	16	−2	2
Iran	4	0	4	0	6	51	−45	0

x – Team sent to the National Team World Cup; y – Team advanced to the World Championship

All times are local (UTC+2).

July 6, 2008; 8:00	Mexico	3 – 4	Netherlands	Eissporthalle, Ratingen, Germany

July 6, 2008; 17:00	Germany	6 – 4	Netherlands	Eissporthalle, Ratingen, Germany

July 6, 2008; 18:30	Belgium	7 – 1	Iran	Eissporthalle, Ratingen, Germany

July 7, 2008; 8:00	Mexico	18 – 2	Iran	Eissporthalle, Ratingen, Germany

July 7, 2008; 15:30	Iran	1 – 14	Netherlands	Eissporthalle, Ratingen, Germany

July 7, 2008; 18:30	Germany	3 – 0	Belgium	Eissporthalle, Ratingen, Germany

July 8, 2008; 8:00	Mexico	2 – 4	Germany	Eissporthalle, Ratingen, Germany

July 8, 2008; 12:30	Belgium	3 – 6	Netherlands	Eissporthalle, Ratingen, Germany

July 8, 2008; 17:00	Germany	12 – 2	Iran	Eissporthalle, Ratingen, Germany

July 8, 2008; 21:30	Mexico	6 – 4	Belgium	Eissporthalle, Ratingen, Germany

== World Championship ==
=== Draw ===
Quarterfinals
A1	Czech Republic	3
D1	Germany	0
B2	Switzerland	2
A3	France	3
A2	United States	7
B3	Italy	1
B1	Canada	3
C1	China	5

Semifinals
QF1	Czech Republic	2
QF3	France	5
QF2	United States	2
QF4	China	1

Finals
SF1	United States	6
SF2	France	3
Bronze-medal game
SF1	Czech Republic	4
SF2	China	3

=== Quarterfinals ===
All times are local (UTC+2).

July 10, 2008; 7:30	Czech Republic	3 – 0	Germany	Eissporthalle, Ratingen, Germany

July 10, 2008; 9:00	United States	7 – 1	Italy	Eissporthalle, Ratingen, Germany

July 10, 2008; 10:30	Switzerland	2 – 3	France	Eissporthalle, Ratingen, Germany

July 10, 2008; 12:00	Canada	3 – 5	China	Eissporthalle, Ratingen, Germany

=== Semifinals ===
All times are local (UTC+2).

July 11, 2008; 12:30	Czech Republic	2 – 5	France	Eissporthalle, Ratingen, Germany

July 11, 2008; 14:00	United States	2 – 1	China	Eissporthalle, Ratingen, Germany

=== Bronze-medal game ===
All times are local (UTC+2)

July 12, 2008; TBA	Czech Republic	4 – 3	China	Eissporthalle, Ratingen, Germany

=== Gold-medal game ===
All times are local (UTC-4)

July 12, 2008; TBA	United States	6 – 3	France	Eissporthalle, Ratingen, Germany

== 5th-8th placement round ==
=== Draw ===
Qualifiers
QF1	Canada	8
QF3	Italy	1
QF2	Switzerland	6
QF4	Germany	2

fifth-place game
Q1	Canada	5
Q2	Switzerland	4
seventh-place game
Q1	Italy	2
Q2	Germany	4

=== Qualifying round ===
All times are local (UTC+2).

July 10, 2008; 17:00	Canada	8 – 1	Italy	Eissporthalle, Ratingen, Germany

July 10, 2008; 18:30	Switzerland	6 – 2	Germany	Eissporthalle, Ratingen, Germany

=== 7th-8th-place game ===
All times are local (UTC+2).

July 11, 2008; 17:00	Italy	2 – 4	Germany	Eissporthalle, Ratingen, Germany

=== 5th-6th-place game ===
All times are local (UTC+2).

July 11, 2008; 18:30	Canada	5 – 4	Switzerland	Eissporthalle, Ratingen, Germany

== National Team World Cup ==
=== Draw ===
Quarterfinals
A4	South Korea	5
D4	Belgium	2
C3	Australia	4
D2	Netherlands	3
D3	Mexico	4
C2	Great Britain	6
B4	Spain	11
C4	Venezuela	1

Semifinals
QF1	South Korea	0
QF3	Great Britain	4
QF2	Spain	4
QF4	Australia	2

Finals
SF1	Spain	3
SF2	Great Britain	1
Bronze-medal game
SF1	South Korea	5
SF2	Australia	4

=== Quarterfinals ===
All times are local (UTC+2).

July 9, 2008; 8:00	South Korea	5 – 2	Belgium	Eissporthalle, Ratingen, Germany

July 9, 2008; 9:30	Australia	4 – 3	Netherlands	Eissporthalle, Ratingen, Germany

July 9, 2008; 11:00	Mexico	4 – 6	Great Britain	Eissporthalle, Ratingen, Germany

July 9, 2008; 12:30	Spain	11 – 1	Venezuela	Eissporthalle, Ratingen, Germany

=== Semifinals ===
All times are local (UTC+2).

July 11, 2008; 9:30	South Korea	0 – 4	Great Britain	Eissporthalle, Ratingen, Germany

July 11, 2008; 11:00	Spain	4 – 2	Australia	Eissporthalle, Ratingen, Germany

=== Bronze-medal game ===
All times are local (UTC+2)

July 12, 2008; 11:00	South Korea	5 – 4	Australia	Eissporthalle, Ratingen, Germany

=== Gold-medal game ===
All times are local (UTC-4)

July 12, 2008; 12:30	Spain	3 – 1	Great Britain	Eissporthalle, Ratingen, Germany

== Placement Round Robin ==
Team	Pld	W	L	D	GF	GA	GD	Pts
Mexico	4	4	0	0	39	9	+30	8
Netherlands	4	3	1	0	32	9	+23	6
Belgium	4	2	2	0	27	11	+16	4
Venezuela	4	0	3	1	8	41	−33	1
Iran	4	0	3	1	7	43	−36	1

All times are local (UTC+2).

July 9, 2008; 14:00	Iran	1 – 14	Netherlands	Eissporthalle, Ratingen, Germany

July 9, 2008; 18:30	Mexico	5 – 2	Belgium	Eissporthalle, Ratingen, Germany

July 9, 2008; 20:00	Netherlands	12 – 3	Venezuela	Eissporthalle, Ratingen, Germany

July 9, 2008; 21:30	Belgium	11 – 2	Iran	Eissporthalle, Ratingen, Germany

July 10, 2008; 13:30	Venezuela	1 – 13	Belgium	Eissporthalle, Ratingen, Germany

July 10, 2008; 15:30	Netherlands	3 – 4	Mexico	Eissporthalle, Ratingen, Germany

July 10, 2008; 20:00	Mexico	16 – 2	Iran	Eissporthalle, Ratingen, Germany

July 10, 2008; 21:30	Belgium	1 – 3	Netherlands	Eissporthalle, Ratingen, Germany

July 11, 2008; 8:00	Venezuela	2 – 14	Mexico	Eissporthalle, Ratingen, Germany

July 11, 2008; 15:30	Iran	2 – 2	Venezuela	Eissporthalle, Ratingen, Germany

== Ranking and statistics ==
FIRS World Championship winners

[[ men's national inline hockey team|]]

FIRS National Team World Cup winners

[[ men's national inline hockey team|]]

=== Tournament Awards ===
- Best players selected by the FIRS:
  - Best Goalkeeper:
  - Best Defenseman:
  - Best Forward:
  - Most Valuable Player:
- All-Tournament Team:
  - Goalkeeper:
  - Defense:
  - Forward:

=== Final standings ===
The final standings of the tournament according to FIRS:

Rk.	Team
1st place, gold medalist(s)	United States
2nd place, silver medalist(s)	France
3rd place, bronze medalist(s)	Czech Republic
4.	China
5.	Canada
6.	Switzerland
7.	Germany
8.	Italy
9.	Spain
10.	Great Britain
11.	South Korea
12.	Australia
13.	Mexico
14.	Netherlands
15.	Belgium
16.	Venezuela
17.	Iran

=== Scoring leaders ===
List shows the top 10 skaters sorted by points, then goals. If the list exceeds 10 skaters because of a tie in points, all of the tied skaters are left out.

Player	GP	G	A	Pts	+/-	PIM	POS

GP = Games played; G = Goals; A = Assists; Pts = Points; +/- = Plus/minus; PIM = Penalties in minutes; POS = Position

=== Leading goaltenders ===
Only the top 5 goaltenders, based on save percentage, who have played over 40% of their team's minutes are included in this list.

Player	TOI	SA	GA	GAA	Sv%	SO

TOI = Time On Ice (minutes:seconds); SA = Shots against; GA = Goals against; GAA = Goals against average; Sv% = Save percentage; SO = Shutouts

== See also ==
- FIRS Inline Hockey World Championships
- List of FIRS Senior Men's Inline Hockey World Championships medalists
