= 2010 FIRS Men's Inline Hockey World Championships =

International sports tournament

Tournament details
- Host country: Czech Republic
- Venue: 1 (in 1 host city)
- Dates: July 12 - July 17
- Teams: 14

Final positions
- Champions: United States

Tournament statistics
- Games played: 44
- Goals scored: 332 (7.55 per game)
- Scoring leader: (Australia) Dean Dunstan

Awards
- MVP: (United States) Travis Fudge

The 2010 FIRS Men's Inline Hockey World Championships was the 16th FIRS Men's Inline Hockey World Championships, an annual international inline hockey tournament organised by the International Roller Sports Federation. It took place between 12 and 17 July 2010 in Beroun, Czech Republic. The United States team was the defending champion, having won the previous two championships.

The tournament was won by the United States, who claimed their 12th world championship title by defeating Switzerland 6–1 in the World Championship final. The Czech Republic won against France 5–2 for the bronze medal. Spain won the World Cup tournament defeating Australia 1–0. The United States' Travis Fudge was named MVP of the tournament. Australia's Dean Dunstan and Michael Smart were the tournament's leading scorer and goaltender in save percentage respectively.

== Participating nations ==
The following 14 nations qualified for the tournament. One nation from Oceania, seven nations from Europe, three nations from North America, and three nations from South America were represented.

Group A

- France
- United States
- Switzerland
- Colombia

Group B

- Czech Republic
- Canada
- Italy
- Spain

Group C

- Mexico
- Germany
- Great Britain
- Australia
- Argentina
- Venezuela

== Group stage ==
Fourteen participating teams were placed in the following four groups. After playing a round-robin, the top three teams from Group A and Group B advanced to World Championship round. The last team in Group A and B advanced to the World Cup round. Teams in Group C also competed in a round-robin with the top two teams advancing to the World Championship round. The teams who finished third and fourth advanced to the World Cup round and the two teams who finished fifth and sixth are sent to compete in the 13th-14th placement game.

=== Group A ===
Team	Pld	W	D	L	GF	GA	GD	Pts	Qualification
France	3	2	1	0	12	6	+6	5	World Championship round
United States	3	2	0	1	17	4	+13	4	World Championship round
Switzerland	3	1	1	1	18	11	+7	3	World Championship round
Colombia	3	0	0	3	2	28	−26	0	World Cup round

July 12, 2010; 12:30	United States	10 – 0 (6–0, 4–0)	Colombia

Game reference

July 12, 2010; 15:30	France	4 – 4 (1–3, 3–1)	Switzerland

Game reference

July 13, 2010; 15:00	Switzerland	12 – 1 (5–1, 7–0)	Colombia

Game reference

July 13, 2010; 16:30	United States	1 – 2 (0–0, 1–2)	France

Game reference

July 14, 2010; 13:00	Colombia	1 – 6 (0–5, 1–1)	France

Game reference

July 14, 2010; 16:00	United States	6 – 2 (4–2, 2–0)	Switzerland

Game reference

=== Group B ===
Team	Pld	W	D	L	GF	GA	GD	Pts	Qualification
Czech Republic	3	3	0	0	16	3	+13	6	World Championship round
Canada	3	2	0	1	15	9	+6	4	World Championship round
Italy	3	1	0	2	9	14	−5	2	World Championship round
Spain	3	0	0	3	3	17	−14	0	World Cup round

July 12, 2010; 14:00	Canada	8 – 1 (4–0, 4–1)	Spain

Game reference

July 12, 2010; 18:10	Italy	2 – 6 (1–4, 1–2)	Czech Republic

Game reference

July 13, 2010; 13:30	Canada	6 – 4 (4–1, 2–3)	Italy

Game reference

July 13, 2010; 20:10	Czech Republic	6 – 0 (4–0, 2–0)	Spain

Game reference

July 14, 2010; 14:30	Italy	3 – 2 (0–2, 3–0)	Spain

Game reference

July 14, 2010; 18:10	Canada	1 – 4 (0–1, 1–3)	Czech Republic

Game reference

=== Group C ===
Team	Pld	W	D	L	GF	GA	GD	Pts	Qualification
Mexico	5	3	1	1	19	16	+3	7	World Championship round
Germany	5	3	1	1	29	19	+10	7	World Championship round
Great Britain	5	3	0	2	24	19	+5	6	World Cup round
Australia	5	3	0	2	22	13	+9	6	World Cup round
Argentina	5	2	0	3	21	23	−2	4	13–14th placement
Venezuela	5	0	0	5	10	35	−25	0	13–14th placement

July 12, 2010; 08:00	Great Britain	9 – 5 (4–1, 5–4)	Venezuela

Game reference

July 12, 2010; 09:30	Germany	9 – 6 (5–3, 4–3)	Argentina

Game reference

July 12, 2010; 11:00	Australia	5 – 3 (3–0, 2–3)	Mexico

Game reference

July 12, 2010; 19:45	Venezuela	0 – 7 (0–2, 0–5)	Germany

Game reference

July 13, 2010; 09:00	Great Britain	2 – 1 (1–1, 1–0)	Australia

Game reference

July 13, 2010; 10:30	Germany	2 – 2 (1–1, 1–1)	Mexico

Game reference

July 13, 2010; 12:00	Argentina	6 – 2 (4–1, 2–1)	Venezuela

Game reference

July 13, 2010; 18:00	Mexico	4 – 3 (2–0, 2–3)	Great Britain

Game reference

July 14, 2010; 08:30	Australia	3 – 6 (0–4, 3–2)	Germany

Game reference

July 14, 2010; 10:00	Great Britain	2 – 4 (0–0, 2–4)	Argentina

Game reference

July 14, 2010; 11:30	Mexico	4 – 2 (3–1, 1–1)	Venezuela

Game reference

July 14, 2010; 19:45	Australia	4 – 1 (3–1, 1–0)	Argentina

Game reference

July 15, 2010; 08:00	Germany	5 – 8 (2–2, 3–6)	Great Britain

Game reference

July 15, 2010; 09:30	Venezuela	1 – 9 (0–3, 1–6)	Australia

Game reference

July 15, 2010; 11:00	Argentina	4 – 6 (1–4, 3–2)	Mexico

Game reference

== World Championship ==
The World Championship round is the top level playoff where the winning team finishes first overall for the tournament and wins the gold medal. It comprises the top three teams from Group A and B and the top two teams from Group C. The winning teams in the quarter-finals move on to compete in the semi-finals, while the losing teams are sent to the fifth-8th placement round. The two winning teams in the semi-finals advance to the gold medal game leaving the losing teams to compete for the bronze medal and third and fourth spot overall.

=== Bracket ===
Quarterfinals
A1	France	4
C2	Germany	1
B2	Canada	5
A3	Switzerland	6
B1	Czech Republic	13
C1	Mexico	1
A2	United States	2
B3	Italy	1

Semifinals
QF1	France	0
QF2	Switzerland	7
QF3	Czech Republic	3
QF4	United States	8

Finals
SF1	Switzerland	1
SF2	United States	6
Bronze medal game
SF1	France	2
SF2	Czech Republic	5

=== Quarter-finals ===
July 15, 2010; 14:00	United States	2 – 1 (0–1, 2–0)	Italy

Game reference

July 15, 2010; 16:00	Canada	5 – 6 OT (3–2, 2–3) ( OT: 0–1 )	Switzerland

Game reference

July 15, 2010; 18:10	Czech Republic	13 – 1 (7–1, 6–0)	Mexico

Game reference

July 15, 2010; 20:00	France	4 – 1 (2–1, 2–0)	Germany

Game reference

=== Semi-finals ===
July 16, 2010; 16:00	France	0 – 7 (0–3, 0–4)	Switzerland

Game reference

July 16, 2010; 18:10	Czech Republic	3 – 8 (2–5, 1–3)	United States

Game reference

=== Bronze medal game ===
July 17, 2010; 16:10	France	2 – 5 (0–4, 2–1)	Czech Republic

Game reference

=== Gold medal game ===
July 17, 2010; 20:00	Switzerland	1 – 6 (0–2, 1–4)	United States

Game reference

== 5th-8th placement round ==
The 5th-8th placement round comprises the four teams who lost in the quarter-finals of the World Championship round. The teams play a qualifier against one other team, with the winners advancing to play-off for the fifth place and the losers compete against each other for seventh place.

=== Bracket ===
Qualifiers
QF1	Italy	6
QF2	Mexico	3
QF4	Canada	8
QF3	Germany	2

5th Place Game
Q1	Italy	4
Q2	Canada	2
7th Place Game
Q3	Mexico	2
Q4	Germany	7

=== Qualifying round ===
July 16, 2010; 12:00	Italy	6 – 3 (3–1, 3–2)	Mexico

Game reference

July 16, 2010; 14:00	Canada	8 – 2 (3–0, 5–2)	Germany

Game reference

=== 7th-8th place game ===
July 17, 2010; 09:00	Mexico	2 – 7 (2–3, 0–4)	Germany

Game reference

=== 5th-6th place game ===
July 17, 2010; 11:00	Italy	4 – 2 (2–0, 2–2)	Canada

Game reference

== World Cup ==
The World Cup round is the second level playoff in the tournament where the winner finishes ninth overall and wins the World Cup gold medal. It also acts as a placement round for the places nine to twelve. The teams compete in a semi-final with the winners moving on to compete for the World Cup gold medal and the losers competing for the World Cup bronze.

=== Bracket ===
Semifinals
B4	Spain	4
C3	Great Britain	3
A4	Colombia	2
C4	Australia	5

Gold medal
SF1	Spain	1
SF2	Australia	0
Bronze medal
SF1	Great Britain	6
SF2	Colombia	1

=== Semi-finals ===
July 16, 2010; 08:00	Spain	4 – 3 OT (2–2, 1–1) ( OT: 1–0 )	Great Britain

Game reference

July 16, 2010; 10:00	Colombia	2 – 5 (1–1, 1–4)	Australia

Game reference

=== Bronze medal game ===
July 17, 2010; 13:00	Great Britain	6 – 1 (5–0, 1–1)	Colombia

Game reference

=== Gold medal game ===
July 17, 2010; 18:00	Spain	1 – 0 (1–0, 0–0)	Australia

Game reference

== 13th-14th place game ==
The 13th-14th placement game consists of the two teams who finished last and second last in Group C. A single game is played with the winner receiving 13th place in the overall standings and the loser receiving 14th.

July 16, 2010; 20:00	Argentina	6 – 3 (5–0, 1–3)	Venezuela

Game reference

== Ranking and statistics ==
2010 FIRS Men's Inline Hockey World Championship

United States

=== Tournament awards ===
- Individual awards:
  - Most Valuable Player: (United States) Travis Fudge
  - Fair Play Award: Spain
  - Best Goalkeeper: (United States) Michael Urbano
  - Best Defenseman: (Czech Republic) Karel Rachunek
  - Best Forward: (Switzerland) Diego Schwarzenbach
- All-Star Team:
  - Goalkeeper: (United States) Michael Urbano
  - Defense: (Czech Republic) Karel Rachunek
  - Forwards: (Mexico) Brian Baxter, (United States) Travis Fudge, (Switzerland) Julien Walker

=== Final standings ===
1st place, gold medalist(s)	United States
2nd place, silver medalist(s)	Switzerland
3rd place, bronze medalist(s)	Czech Republic
4	France
5	Italy
6	Canada
7	Germany
8	Mexico
9	Spain
10	Australia
11	Great Britain
12	Colombia
13	Argentina
14	Venezuela

=== Scoring leaders ===
List shows the top skaters sorted by points, then goals.

Player	GP	G	A	Pts	POS
(Australia) Dean Dunstan	7	13	4	17	32
(Mexico) Brian Baxter	8	12	5	17	2
(United Kingdom) Rob Shelton	7	9	6	15	2
(Germany) Adriano Carciola	8	9	6	15	6
(Switzerland) Julian Walker	6	8	6	14	4
(United States) Pete Messina	6	7	6	13	0
(United Kingdom) Danny Hutchinson	7	11	1	12	8
(Switzerland) Diego Schwarzenbach	6	9	3	12	4
(Mexico) Julian Ramirez	8	6	6	12	8
(Australia) Stephen Belic	7	5	7	12	8

=== Leading goaltenders ===
Only the top five goaltenders, based on save percentage.

Player	MIP	SOG	GA	GAA	SVS%	SO
(Australia) Michael Smart	120	78	5	1.67	93.59	0
(United States) Michael Urbano	200	115	8	1.60	93.04	1
(Czech Republic) Ondrej Jirkuv	92	24	2	0.87	91.67	1
(Italy) Stefano Antinori	120	93	8	2.67	91.40	0
(France) Hugo Rebuffet	132	84	8	2.42	90.48	0

== See also ==
- FIRS Inline Hockey World Championships
- List of FIRS Senior Men's Inline Hockey World Championships medalists
