= Inline hockey at the 2017 World Games =

Inline hockey competition

- Venue: Sports and Recreation Centre (Świdnica)
- Dates: 25–29 July
- No. of events: 1
- Competitors: 112 from 8 nations

Medalists
1st place, gold medalist(s)		Czech Republic
2nd place, silver medalist(s)		France
3rd place, bronze medalist(s)		Switzerland

The inline hockey competition at the 2017 World Games took place from 25 to 29 July 2017 in Wrocław, Poland.

== Medalists ==
Event	Gold	Silver	Bronze
Men's tournament	Czech Republic; Jakub Bernard; Daniel Brabec; Jakub Cik; Martin Fiala; Lukáš Langer; Marek Loskot; Robin Malý; Adam Přibyl; David Roupec; Tomáš Rubeš; Patrik Šebek; Michal Šimo; Pavel Strýček; Mikuláš Zbořil	France; Clément Belot; Baptiste Bouchut; Renaud Crigner; Roman De Preval; Karl Gabillet; Lambert Hamon; Jean-François Ladonne; Maxime Langlois; Jérémy Lapresa; Jolan Mogniat-Duclos; Antoine Rage; Jérôme Salley; Benjamin Tijou; Romain Horrut	Switzerland; Alain Bahar; Corentin Collaud; Lukas Dietrich; Ken Häflinger; Stefan Hürlimann; Dario Kummer; Michael Loosli; Fabien Maier; Jean Savary; Daniel Steiner; Stefan Tschannen; Pascal Wittwer; Andreas Zehnder; Quentin Zürcher

== Preliminary round ==
=== Group A ===
Team	GP	W	OTW	OTL	L	GF	GA	DIF	PTS
Czech Republic	3	2	0	0	1	11	6	+5	4
Canada	3	2	0	0	1	12	7	+5	4
United States	3	2	0	0	1	14	9	+5	4
Poland	3	0	0	0	3	2	17	–15	0

25 July 2017; 16:00	United States	1 – 7	Canada

25 July 2017; 20:00	Czech Republic	4 – 1	Poland

26 July 2017; 10:00	Canada	2 – 5	Czech Republic

26 July 2017; 16:00	Poland	0 – 10	United States

27 July 2017; 14:00	Czech Republic	2 – 3	United States

27 July 2017; 18:00	Canada	3 – 1	Poland

=== Group B ===
Team	GP	W	OTW	OTL	L	GF	GA	DIF	PTS
France	3	3	0	0	0	17	4	+3	6
Switzerland	3	2	0	0	1	14	5	+9	4
Italy	3	1	0	0	2	5	14	-9	2
Argentina	3	0	0	0	3	1	14	–13	0

25 July 2017; 14:00	France	3 – 2	Switzerland

25 July 2017; 18:00	Italy	2 – 0	Argentina

26 July 2017; 12:00	Argentina	1 – 6	France

26 July 2017; 14:00	Switzerland	6 – 2	Italy

27 July 2017; 12:00	Switzerland	6 – 0	Argentina

27 July 2017; 16:00	Italy	1 – 8	France

== Playoff round ==
=== Semifinals ===
28 July 2017; 18:00	France	5 – 1	Canada

28 July 2017; 20:00	Czech Republic	5 – 2	Switzerland

=== Seventh place game ===
29 July 2017; 10:00	Argentina	5 – 1	Poland

=== Fifth place game ===
29 July 2017; 12:00	United States	6 – 4	Italy

=== Bronze medal game ===
29 July 2017; 14:00	Canada	3 – 4	Switzerland

=== Gold medal game ===
29 July 2017; 16:00	France	1 – 5	Czech Republic

== Final standings ==
Rk.	Team
Gold medal	Czech Republic
Silver medal	France
Bronze medal	Switzerland
4.	Canada
5.	United States
6.	Italy
7.	Argentina
8.	Poland
