= 2012 FIRS Senior Men's Inline Hockey World Championships =

International sports tournament

Tournament details
- Host country: Colombia
- Venue: 1 (in 1 host city)
- Dates: 8–14 July
- Teams: 16

Final positions
- Champions: United States (14th title)
- Runners-up: Canada
- Third place: Czech Republic
- Fourth place: Italy

Tournament statistics
- Scoring leader(s): (Colombia) Nicolas Fierro Torres (15 points)

Awards
- MVP: (United States) Dustin Roux

The 2012 FIRS Senior Men's Inline Hockey World Championships was the 18th World Championships, an annual international inline hockey tournament. It took place between 8–14 July 2012 in Colombia.

United States won the tournament by defeating Canada 6–4 in the Final game to capture their 14th title; the Americans finished the tournament undefeated with a record of 6–0–0. The Czech Republic captured the bronze medal by defeating Italy 4–3 in the bronze medal game. The tournament's top scorer was Colombia's Nicolas Fierro Torres. United States' Dustin Roux was named the most valuable player of the tournament.

== Venues ==
All games were played at the Coliseo Bicentenario in Bucaramanga, Colombia.

Coliseo Bicentenario
Capacity:

Colombia – Bucaramanga

== Rosters ==
Each team's roster for the 2012 FIRS Senior Men's Inline Hockey World Championships consisted of at least 6 skaters (forwards, and defencemen) and 2 goaltenders, and at most 14 skaters and 2 goaltenders. All sixteen participating nations, through the confirmation of their respective national associations, had to submit a roster prior to the event.

== Nations ==
The following 16 nations qualified for the tournament. 1 nation from Australia, 6 nations from Europe, 3 nations from North American and 6 nations from South America are represented.

Australia

- Australia (Note: Qualified for Group 1 after a top 10 placement at the 2011 FIRS World Championship)

Europe

- Czech Republic
- France
- Germany (Note: Qualified for Group 2 after a bottom 8 placement at the 2011 FIRS World Championship)
- Italy
- Latvia (Note: Qualified for Group 2 as new entrant)
- Switzerland

North America

- Canada
- Mexico
- United States

South America

- Argentina
- Brazil
- Chile
- Colombia
- Ecuador
- Venezuela

== Seedings and groupings ==
The seeding in the preliminary round was based on the 2012 FIRS World Championship final rankings. The teams were grouped by seeding (in parentheses is the corresponding final ranking).

=== Group 1 ===
Pool A

- Czech Republic (1)
- Canada (4)
- France (5)
- Australia (10)

Pool B

- Italy (2)
- United States (3)
- Switzerland (6)
- Argentina (7)

=== Group 2 ===
Pool C

- Germany (11)
- Venezuela (16)
- Brazil (B)
- Latvia (L)

Pool D

- Mexico (12)
- Colombia (13)
- Chile (C)
- Ecuador (E)

== 5th through 8th placement round ==
Qualifiers
LQF3	Colombia	2
LQF1	France	3
LQF2	Switzerland	6
LQF4	Latvia	4

5th place game
WQ2	France	4
WQ1	Switzerland	5
7th place game
LQ2	Colombia	1
LQ1	Latvia	3

== 13th through 16th placement round ==
Qualifiers
LQF4	Chile	2
LQF1	Mexico	15
LQF2	Ecuador	1
LQF3	Venezuela	6

15th place game
WQ1	Mexico	3
WQ2	Venezuela	1
13th place game
LQ1	Chile	1
LQ2	Ecuador	2

== Ranking and statistics ==
2012 FIRS World Championship winners

United States
14th title

2012 FIRS National Team World Cup winners

Germany

=== Tournament awards ===
- Best players selected by the tournament directors:
  - Best Goalkeeper: (Canada) Dylan Ellis
  - Most Valuable Player: (United States) Dustin Roux
- Fair Play: Chile

=== Final standings ===
The official FIRS final standings of the tournament:

Gold medal	United States
Silver medal	Canada
Bronze medal	Czech Republic
4	Italy
5	Switzerland
6	France
7	Latvia
8	Colombia
9	Germany
10	Brazil
11	Australia
12	Argentina
13	Mexico
14	Venezuela
15	Ecuador
16	Chile

=== Scoring leaders ===
List shows the top skaters sorted by points, then goals. If the list exceeds 10 skaters because of a tie in points, all of the tied skaters are shown.

Player	GP	G	A	Pts	PIM
(Colombia) Nicolas Fierro Torres	6	7	8	15	
(Mexico) Julian Ramirez	6	9	5	14	
(Canada) Thomas Woods	6	8	6	14	
(Colombia) Juan Diego Fierro Miranda	6	7	5	12	
(United States) Joshua Laricchia	6	5	6	11	
(Brazil) Jose Alexandre Guilardi	5	4	7	11	
(Mexico) Allen Rey Gonzales	6	7	3	10	
(Canada) Marcus Pryde	6	7	3	10	
(United States) Dustin Roux	6	7	3	10	
(Switzerland) Diego Schwarzenback	6	6	4	10	
(Italy) Ingemar Gruber	6	6	4	10	
(Mexico) Roberto Ordonez	6	1	9	10	

GP = Games played; G = Goals; A = Assists; Pts = Points; +/− = Plus/minus; PIM = Penalties in minutes; POS = Position

== See also ==
- FIRS Inline Hockey World Championships
- List of FIRS Senior Men's Inline Hockey World Championships medalists
