= 2007 FIRS Men's Inline Hockey World Championships =

International sports tournament

Tournament details
- Host country: Spain
- Venue: 1 (in 1 host city)
- Dates: July 5 - July 12
- Teams: 15

Final positions
- Champions: Czech Republic (1st title)

The FIRS Men's Inline Hockey World Championships XIII was played between July 2 and July 7, 2007, in the Spanish city of Bilbao. The venue was the Bilbao Kirolak Zorrotza. The tournament was won by Czech Republic which claimed its first gold medal. It was the 13th FIRS Inline Hockey World Championship event, and was run by the International Roller Sports Federation (FIRS). It was the first time the tournament was held in the country of Spain.

== Participating teams ==
=== Group 1 ===
Pool A

- France (roster)
- Japan (roster)
- Switzerland (roster)
- United States (roster)

Pool B

- Czech Republic (roster)
- Canada (roster)
- Mexico (roster)
- Spain (roster)

=== Group 2 ===
Pool C

- Colombia (roster)
- Belgium (roster)
- South Korea (roster)

Pool D

- Chinese Taipei (roster)
- Germany (roster)
- Great Britain (roster)
- Italy (roster)

== Rules ==
For standing purposes, points shall be awarded as follows:

- 2 points for a win
- 1 point for a tie
- No points for a loss

If teams are tied in a standing based on points, the following tie-breakers are applied: 1) The most points earned in direct games involving tied teams. 2) The best goal differential in direct games involving tied teams. 3) The most goal scored in direct games involving tied teams. 4) Follow steps 1, 2 and 3 with games involving the highest non-tied team in the same group. 5) Repeat step 4 with games involving the second highest non-tied team in the same group. 6) Continue this process with all non-tied team games.

== Group 1 ==
The top eight inline hockey nations were placed in the following two pools. After playing a round robin, the top three teams in each pool advance to the World Championship while the last team in each pool are relegated to the National Team World Cup.

=== Pool A ===
Team	Pld	W	L	D	GF	GA	GD	Pts
y – Switzerland	3	3	0	0	27	2	+25	6
y – United States	3	2	1	0	25	7	+18	4
y – France	3	1	2	0	12	8	+4	2
x – Japan	3	0	3	0	0	47	−47	0

x – Team sent to the National Team World Cup; y – Team advanced to the World Championship

All times are local (UTC+2).

July 2, 2007; 11:00	United States	18 - 0	Japan	Bilbao Kirolak Zorrotza, Bilbao, Spain

July 2, 2007; 20:30	France	0 - 3	Switzerland	Bilbao Kirolak Zorrotza, Bilbao, Spain

July 3, 2007; 12:00	Switzerland	21 - 0	Japan	Bilbao Kirolak Zorrotza, Bilbao, Spain

July 3, 2007; 19:30	France	4 - 5	United States	Bilbao Kirolak Zorrotza, Bilbao, Spain

July 4, 2007; 13:30	Japan	0 - 8	France	Bilbao Kirolak Zorrotza, Bilbao, Spain

July 4, 2007; 19:30	United States	2 - 3	Switzerland	Bilbao Kirolak Zorrotza, Bilbao, Spain

=== Pool B ===
Team	Pld	W	L	D	GF	GA	GD	Pts
y – Czech Republic	3	3	0	0	21	5	+16	6
y – Spain	3	2	1	0	9	9	0	4
y – Canada	3	1	2	0	14	9	+5	2
x – Mexico	3	0	3	0	2	23	−21	0

x – Team sent to the National Team World Cup; y – Team advanced to the World Championship

All times are local (UTC+2).

July 2, 2007; 9:30	Czech Republic	9 - 1	Mexico	Bilbao Kirolak Zorrotza, Bilbao, Spain

July 2, 2007; 19:00	Spain	3 - 2	Canada	Bilbao Kirolak Zorrotza, Bilbao, Spain

July 3, 2007; 13:30	Canada	2 - 6	Czech Republic	Bilbao Kirolak Zorrotza, Bilbao, Spain

July 3, 2007; 18:00	Spain	4 - 1	Mexico	Bilbao Kirolak Zorrotza, Bilbao, Spain

July 4, 2007; 10:30	Mexico	0 - 10	Canada	Bilbao Kirolak Zorrotza, Bilbao, Spain

July 4, 2007; 18:00	Czech Republic	6 - 2	Spain	Bilbao Kirolak Zorrotza, Bilbao, Spain

== Group 2 ==
The remaining inline hockey nations were placed in the following two pools. After playing a round robin, the top team in each pool advance to the World Championship while the rest of the teams in each pool are relegated to the National Team World Cup.

=== Pool C ===
Team	Pld	W	L	D	GF	GA	GD	Pts
y – South Korea	2	1	0	1	9	7	+2	3
x – Colombia	2	0	0	2	6	6	0	2
x – Belgium	2	0	1	1	7	9	−2	1

x – Team sent to the National Team World Cup; y – Team advanced to the World Championship

All times are local (UTC+2).

July 2, 2007; 15:30	South Korea	6 - 4	Belgium	Bilbao Kirolak Zorrotza, Bilbao, Spain

July 3, 2007; 15:00	Colombia	3 - 3	Belgium	Bilbao Kirolak Zorrotza, Bilbao, Spain

July 4, 2007; 9:00	Colombia	3 - 3	South Korea	Bilbao Kirolak Zorrotza, Bilbao, Spain

=== Pool D ===
Team	Pld	W	L	D	GF	GA	GD	Pts
y – Italy	3	3	0	0	18	3	+15	6
x – Germany	3	2	1	0	24	7	+17	4
x – Great Britain	3	1	2	0	14	12	+2	2
x – Chinese Taipei	3	0	3	0	3	37	−34	0

x – Team sent to the National Team World Cup; y – Team advanced to the World Championship

All times are local (UTC+2).

July 2, 2007; 12:30	Great Britain	1 - 5	Italy	Bilbao Kirolak Zorrotza, Bilbao, Spain

July 2, 2007; 14:00	Chinese Taipei	1 - 17	Germany	Bilbao Kirolak Zorrotza, Bilbao, Spain

July 3, 2007; 9:00	Germany	5 - 3	Great Britain	Bilbao Kirolak Zorrotza, Bilbao, Spain

July 3, 2007; 16:30	Italy	10 - 0	Chinese Taipei	Bilbao Kirolak Zorrotza, Bilbao, Spain

July 4, 2007; 12:00	Germany	2 - 3	Italy	Bilbao Kirolak Zorrotza, Bilbao, Spain

July 4, 2007; 15:00	Chinese Taipei	2 - 10	Great Britain	Bilbao Kirolak Zorrotza, Bilbao, Spain

== World Championship ==
=== Draw ===
Quarterfinals
A1	Switzerland	7
D1	Italy	6
B2	Spain	1
A3	France	3
A2	United States	5
B3	Canada	8
B1	Czech Republic	16
C1	South Korea	2

Semifinals
QF4	Switzerland	7
QF1	France	4
QF2	Canada	7
QF3	Czech Republic	8

Finals
SF1	Switzerland	2
SF2	Czech Republic	5
Bronze medal game
SF1	France	2
SF2	Canada	3

=== Quarterfinals ===
All times are local (UTC+2).

July 10, 2008; 7:30	1st Pool A	v	1st Pool D	Eissporthalle, Ratingen, Germany

July 10, 2008; 9:00	2nd Pool A	v	3rd Pool B	Eissporthalle, Ratingen, Germany

July 10, 2008; 10:30	2nd Pool B	v	3rd Pool A	Eissporthalle, Ratingen, Germany

July 10, 2008; 12:00	1st Pool B	v	1st Pool C	Eissporthalle, Ratingen, Germany

=== Semifinals ===
All times are local (UTC+2).

July 11, 2008; 12:30	Winner Semifinal 1	v	Winner Semifinal 3	Eissporthalle, Ratingen, Germany

July 11, 2008; 14:00	Winner Semifinal 2	v	Winner Semifinal 4	Eissporthalle, Ratingen, Germany

=== Bronze Medal Game ===
All times are local (UTC+2)

July 12, 2008; TBA	Loser Semifinal 1	v	Loser Semifinal 2	Eissporthalle, Ratingen, Germany

=== Gold Medal Game ===
All times are local (UTC-4)

July 12, 2008; TBA	Winner Semifinal 1	v	Winner Semifinal 2	Eissporthalle, Ratingen, Germany

== 5th-8th placement round ==
=== Draw ===
Qualifiers
QF4	Italy	6
QF1	Spain	3
QF2	United States	10
QF3	South Korea	3

5th Place Game
P1	Italy	5
P2	United States	6
7th Place Game
P1	Spain	4
P2	South Korea	2

=== Placement round ===
All times are local (UTC+2).

July 10, 2008; 17:00	Loser World Championship Quarterfinal 1	v	Loser World Championship Quarterfinal 3	Eissporthalle, Ratingen, Germany

July 10, 2008; 18:30	Loser World Championship Quarterfinal 2	v	Loser World Championship Quarterfinal 4	Eissporthalle, Ratingen, Germany

=== 7th-8th Place Game ===
All times are local (UTC+2).

July 11, 2008; 17:00	Loser Qualifier 1	v	Loser Qualifier 2	Eissporthalle, Ratingen, Germany

=== 5th-6th Place Game ===
All times are local (UTC+2).

July 11, 2008; 18:30	Winner Qualifier 1	v	Winner Qualifier 2	Eissporthalle, Ratingen, Germany

== National Team World Cup ==
=== Draw ===
Quarterfinals
A4	Japan	5
D4	Chinese Taipei	4
C3	Belgium	1
D2	Germany	7
D3	Great Britain	5
C2	Colombia	4
B4	Mexico
Bye

Semifinals
QF3	Japan	0
QF2	Germany	13
QF1	Great Britain	5
B4	Mexico	4

Finals
SF2	Germany	2
SF1	Great Britain	3
Bronze medal game
SF2	Japan	2
SF1	Mexico	6

=== Quarterfinals ===
All times are local (UTC+2).

July 9, 2008; 8:00	4th Pool A	v	4th Pool D	Eissporthalle, Ratingen, Germany

July 9, 2008; 9:30	3rd Pool C	v	2nd Pool D	Eissporthalle, Ratingen, Germany

July 9, 2008; 11:00	3rd Pool D	v	2nd Pool C	Eissporthalle, Ratingen, Germany

July 9, 2008; 12:30	4th Pool B	v	4th Pool C	Eissporthalle, Ratingen, Germany

=== Semifinals ===
All times are local (UTC+2).

July 11, 2008; 9:30	Winner Semifinal 1	v	Winner Semifinal 2	Eissporthalle, Ratingen, Germany

July 11, 2008; 11:00	Winner Semifinal 3	v	Winner Semifinal 4	Eissporthalle, Ratingen, Germany

=== Bronze Medal Game ===
All times are local (UTC+2)

July 12, 2008; 11:00	Loser Semifinal 1	v	Loser Semifinal 2	Eissporthalle, Ratingen, Germany

=== Gold Medal Game ===
All times are local (UTC-4)

July 12, 2008; 12:30	Winner Semifinal 1	v	Winner Semifinal 2	Eissporthalle, Ratingen, Germany

== Placement Round Robin ==
Team	Pld	W	L	D	GF	GA	GD	Pts
Colombia	2	1	0	1	8	6	+2	3
Belgium	2	1	1	0	8	7	+1	2
Chinese Taipei	2	0	1	1	7	10	−3	1

All times are local (UTC+2).

July 9, 2008; 14:00	5th Pool D	v	Loser NTWC QF1	Eissporthalle, Ratingen, Germany

July 9, 2008; 18:30	Loser NTWC QF2	v	Loser NTWC QF3	Eissporthalle, Ratingen, Germany

July 9, 2008; 20:00	Loser NTWC QF1	v	Loser NTWC QF4	Eissporthalle, Ratingen, Germany

July 9, 2008; 21:30	Loser NTWC QF3	v	5th Pool D	Eissporthalle, Ratingen, Germany

July 10, 2008; 13:30	Loser NTWC QF4	v	Loser NTWC QF3	Eissporthalle, Ratingen, Germany

July 10, 2008; 15:30	Loser NTWC QF1	v	Loser NTWC QF2	Eissporthalle, Ratingen, Germany

July 10, 2008; 20:00	Loser NTWC QF2	v	5th Pool D	Eissporthalle, Ratingen, Germany

July 10, 2008; 21:30	Loser NTWC QF3	v	Loser NTWC QF1	Eissporthalle, Ratingen, Germany

July 11, 2008; 8:00	Loser NTWC QF4	v	Loser NTWC QF2	Eissporthalle, Ratingen, Germany

July 11, 2008; 15:30	5th Pool D	v	Loser NTWC QF4	Eissporthalle, Ratingen, Germany

== Ranking and statistics ==
FIRS World Championship XIII winners

Czech Republic
First title

2007 FIRS National Team World Cup winners

Great Britain
First title

=== Tournament Awards ===
- Best players selected by the FIRS:
  - Best Goalkeeper:
  - Best Defenseman:
  - Best Forward:
  - Most Valuable Player:
- All-Tournament Team:
  - Goalkeeper:
  - Defense:
  - Forward:

=== Final standings ===
The final standings of the tournament according to FIRS:

Rk.	Team
1st place, gold medalist(s)	Czech Republic
2nd place, silver medalist(s)	Switzerland
3rd place, bronze medalist(s)	Canada
4.	France
5.	United States
6.	Italy
7.	Spain
8.	South Korea
1st place, gold medalist(s)	Great Britain
2nd place, silver medalist(s)	Germany
3rd place, bronze medalist(s)	Mexico
12.	Japan
13.	Belgium
14.	Colombia
15.	Chinese Taipei

=== Scoring leaders ===
List shows the top 10 skaters sorted by points, then goals. If the list exceeds 10 skaters because of a tie in points, all of the tied skaters are left out.

Player	GP	G	A	Pts	+/-	PIM	POS

GP = Games played; G = Goals; A = Assists; Pts = Points; +/- = Plus/minus; PIM = Penalties in minutes; POS = Position

=== Leading goaltenders ===
Only the top 5 goaltenders, based on save percentage, who have played over 40% of their team's minutes are included in this list.

Player	TOI	SA	GA	GAA	Sv%	SO

TOI = Time on ice (minutes:seconds); SA = Shots against; GA = Goals against; GAA = Goals against average; Sv% = Save percentage; SO = Shutouts

== See also ==
- FIRS Inline Hockey World Championships
- List of FIRS Senior Men's Inline Hockey World Championships medalists
