= Ana Carolina Boghossian =

Brazilian hockey player and administrator (born 1997)

Personal information
- Born: Ana Carolina Boghossian Cordovil c.1997 (age 28–29) Rio de Janeiro, Brazil
- Education: Bentley University
- Occupation: Sports administrator
- Height: 5 ft (1.5 m)
- Weight: 99 lb (45 kg)
Ice hockey career
- Position: Right Wing
- Shoots: Left
- Played for: All Pacas; Eldorado Vipers; Ozone
- National team: Brazil
- Playing career: 2014–present

Sport
- Country: Brazil
- Sport: Inline hockey
- Position: Forward
- Shoots: Left

Ana Carolina Boghossian Cordovil (born c. 1997) is a Brazilian ice hockey player, inline hockey player, and sports administrator. She has represented Brazil internationally with the national ice hockey team and national inline hockey team. Boghossian is a key builder in the development of women's ice hockey in the country as a member of the Technical Committee of the Brazilian Ice Sports Federation (CBDG).

== Playing career ==
=== Youth ===
Unlike many Brazilian players who are first introduced to ice hockey through inline skating due to the country's limited ice facilities, Boghossian began skating on ice at a young age. She grew up in Rio de Janeiro near a shopping mall ice rink in Barra da Tijuca, where she learned basic skating skills at the age of six and began playing hockey at nine.

Boghossian's interest in ice hockey also developed while accompanying her brother to the Mad Parrots team training sessions in 2005. She trained at the facility until its closure in 2012 and after that, she honed her inline hockey training.

In the late 1990s and early 2000s, Brazilian inline hockey experienced significant growth, while ice hockey development progressed more slowly in comparison due to infrastructure limitations. In Rio de Janeiro, former player and coach Geralaldo Cardoso played a central role in sustaining ice hockey activities by organizing programs that moved between small rink locations over time. These efforts led to some of the first ice hockey tournaments in the country, including the Rio–São Paulo Challenge (Brazilian Portuguese: Desafio Rio–São Paulo), which invited prominent men's inline hockey players to compete on ice.

Boghossian was unable to participate in the Rio–São Paulo Challenge due to eligibility restrictions. In response, she helped organize a concurrent women's event, allowing female players to experience an ice hockey competition for the first time. At this event, she met Sonia Casanova and her daughters, Anita and Renata, who would later become influential figures in Brazilian and Latin American ice hockey development.

=== College ===
Boghossian moved to the United States in 2014, at age seventeen, to attend Bentley University in Waltham, Massachusetts. Prior to her departure, she expressed the intention to return to Brazil after completing her degree in order to contribute to the development of ice hockey in the country.

As a senior, she was a member of the inaugural Bentley women's club ice hockey team and played in the 2018–19 season of the American Collegiate Hockey Association (ACHA) Division II. She was also an operations assistant for the Boston Pride.

During her time at Bentley, she was involved in athletics-related activities, including working with the university's athletics marketing and video production team.

She graduated in 2019 with a degree in Creative Industries and minors in Marketing and Sports Management and after graduating, she settled in Boston, where she worked as a marketing coordinator for a digital printing and graphics company, while continuing to play hockey recreationally.

== 2014 FIRS Inline Hockey World Championships ==
Boghossian represented Brazil at the FIRS Inline Hockey World Championships in 2014 in Toulouse, France.

== 2015 Pan-American Ice Hockey Championship ==
Ana Carolina Boghossian was one of the Brazilian athletes selected to represent Brazil at the Pan American Ice Hockey Tournament, held in Mexico in 2015. Her participation occurred under exceptional circumstances due to insufficient financial support to cover travel and accommodation expenses for the full Brazilian delegation.

Only four Brazilian players, including Boghossian, were able to travel to the host country. To meet the minimum requirement of ten athletes for the competition, the CBHP (Brazilian Confederation of Hockey and Skating), with authorization from the Confederação Brasileira de Desportos no Gelo (CBDG), allowed the remaining roster positions to be filled by six Mexican players. This arrangement ensured Brazil's participation in the tournament and marked the country's first appearance in an international ice hockey competition.

The estimated participation cost of approximately R$4,000 per athlete prevented several leading Brazilian players from attending the event. Despite these limitations, Boghossian and her teammates competed as part of a mixed roster officially registered as a Brazilian Team, rather than as a full national team.

To make their participation possible, the athletes carried out independent fundraising initiatives, including the sale of raffle tickets, and were responsible for producing their own uniforms. Although the conditions differed from those of a traditional national delegation, the competition represented an important step in increasing the visibility of ice hockey in Brazil, particularly among athletes transitioning from inline hockey, such as Ana Carolina Boghossian.

The team would finish the championship in the last place with four defeats.

== 2017 Pan-American Ice Hockey Championship ==
Boghossian represented Brazil at the 2017 Pan-American Ice Hockey Championship, making history as part of the first full female Brazilian ice hockey team to compete in the tournament.

== Return to Brazil ==
In 2020, the COVID-19 pandemic significantly affected the events industry, leading to the closure of the company where Boghossian was employed. As a result, after completing her studies, she returned to Brazil, then she reinserted herself into the national hockey scene through inline hockey, which has long served as the primary entry point for women due to the scarcity of ice rinks. She tried out for—and was selected to—the Brazilian women's national inline hockey team, a step she considers fundamental to reconnecting with the local hockey community.

During this period, she began independently developing projects related to ice hockey, presenting proposals to clubs and sports federations focused on long-term growth strategies, particularly initiatives aimed at increasing participation among women and children.

Her work led to an invitation from Salvador Neto, Director of Hockey at the Brazilian Ice Sports Federation (Confederação Brasileira de Desportos no Gelo – CBDG), to join the organization. In this role, she became involved in planning and implementing programs to support the development of ice hockey in Brazil, with a particular emphasis on the women's game.

== Brazil's inaugural women's ice hockey championship ==
Boghossian's efforts came to fruition in 2022, when she was one of the people behind Brazil's inaugural women's ice hockey championship, organized by the CBDG. The event marked a historic first for the country and was held alongside instructional clinics designed to ease the transition from inline to ice hockey. More experienced players were grouped into competitive teams, while newcomers were introduced to the fundamentals of playing on ice.

== 2022 world skate games ==
While not playing for any clubs in 2022, Boghossian was called to join the senior Brazilian women's inline hockey team and participate at the World Skate Games in Argentina.

== 2023 IIHF Women's Ice Hockey Summit ==
In February 2023, Boghossian participated in the IIHF Women's Ice Hockey Summit in Budapest, Hungary, which brought together delegates from 50 countries to discuss the development of the women's game. Representing Brazil, she described the summit as “a major turning point” for women's hockey worldwide, emphasizing the importance of international collaboration and shared strategies to strengthen women's programs at the national level.

== 2024 Women's World Inline Hockey Championships ==
In July 2024, she was officially called up to represent Brazil at the Senior Women's World Inline Hockey Championships in Roccaraso, Italy, scheduled for September of that year.

== 2025 Brazilian Women's Ice Hockey Championship ==
Boghossian was part of the Eldorado Vipers team that won the 2025 Brazilian Women's Ice Hockey Championship, a competition organized and supervised by the Brazilian Ice Sports Confederation (CBDG). The Eldorado Vipers completed the tournament with an undefeated record, winning all seven of their matches and securing the first national title in the club's history.

The championship began in September at Arena Ice Brasil, in São Paulo, and featured four teams: Eldorado Vipers, Ozone, Rhinos Ice Hockey, and Lobas Hockey. During the preliminary phase, the Eldorado Vipers achieved six consecutive victories, finishing first and qualifying for the final.

The final match was held on 5 October, with the Eldorado Vipers facing Ozone, the defending champions aiming for a fourth consecutive title. The Eldorado Vipers won the final by a score of 6–3, ending Ozone's title streak. With this victory, the club improved upon its previous finishes in the Brazilian elite championship, where it had placed third and second in earlier editions.

== Honours ==
Eldorado Vipers

- Brazilian Women's Ice Hockey Championship: 2025
