= Second Roller In-line Hockey World Championship =

1996 sporting competition

Tournament details
- Host country: Italy
- Venue: 1 (in 1 host city)
- Dates: 9–15 September 1996
- Teams: 10

Final positions
- Champions: United States (2nd title)
- Runners-up: France
- Third place: Italy
- Fourth place: Austria

Tournament statistics
- Games played: 37
- Goals scored: 220 (5.95 per game)
- Scoring leader(s): (Italy) Gianluca Tomasello (Austria) Andreas Woell (17 points)

The Second Roller In-line Hockey World Championship was the second such event organized by the Fédération Internationale de Roller Skating. It was hosted by Italy in Roccaraso. Ten national teams competed in one venue, the Roccaraso Palaghiaccio. The competition also served as qualifications for the third competition.

The United States, for the second consecutive year, went undefeated throughout the championship and captured its second gold medal by defeating France 7–1 in the final. Italy captured the bronze medal with a 6–0 victory over Austria.

== Host selection ==
The venue listed as host for the inline hockey teams was the Roccaraso Palaghiaccio "G Bolino".

== Venues ==
Roccaraso
Roccaraso Palaghiaccio
"G. Bolino"
Capacity:

== Rosters ==
Each team's roster consists of at least 6 skaters (forwards and defencemen) and two goaltenders, and at most 14 skaters and two goaltenders. All twelve participating nations, through the confirmation of their respective national associations, have to submit a roster by the start of the competition.

== Format ==
The ten teams were divided into two pools of which the four best in each advanced to the medal round. There they met cross-over as indicated in the section below. The remaining teams played additional matches to determine their overall championship position.

In the round robin pool play, points were awarded as follows:

- 2 points for a win (W)
- 1 point for a tie (T)
- 0 points for a loss (L)
- –2 points for a forfeit (F)

If two or more teams finished with an equal number of points during pool play, the team's position is determined by the following tiebreaking formula:

1. The victor of the head-to-head competition
2. The lowest total of goals allowed in common wins among the tied teams
3. A shootout will take place.

Final ranking: places 1–4 were determined by the medal games. Places 5–10 were determined by the 5/10 placement round.

== Pool play ==
All times are local (UTC+2).

=== Pool A ===
Pos	Team	Pld	W	L	D	GF	GA	GD	Pts	Qualification
1	United States	4	4	0	0	34	3	+31	8	Medal round
2	Austria	4	3	1	0	37	17	+20	6	Medal round
3	Argentina	4	2	2	0	20	16	+4	4	Medal round
4	Spain	4	1	3	0	27	15	+12	2	Medal round
5	Great Britain	4	0	4	0	4	71	−67	0	5 through 10 placement round

=== Pool B ===
Pos	Team	Pld	W	L	D	GF	GA	GD	Pts	Qualification
1	France	4	4	0	0	34	8	+26	8	Medal round
2	Italy	4	3	1	0	34	5	+29	6	Medal round
3	Brazil	3	1	2	0	12	7	+5	2	Medal round
4	Australia	3	1	2	0	14	16	−2	2	Medal round
5	Ecuador	4	0	4	0	4	62	−58	0	5 through 10 placement round

== Medal round ==
Quarterfinals
A1	United States	9
B4	Australia	1
B2	Italy	5
A3	Argentina	4
B1	France	4
A4	Spain	1
A2	Austria	7
B3	Brazil	3

Semifinals
A1	United States	6
B2	Italy	2
B1	France	4
A2	Austria	1

Gold medal game
A1	United States	7
B1	France	1
Bronze medal game
B2	Italy	6
A2	Austria	0

Note: Teams eliminated in the quarterfinals advance to the 5 through 10 placement round.

All times are local (UTC+2).

== 5 through 10 placement round ==
Pos	Team	Pld	W	L	D	GF	GA	GD	Pts	Qualification
1	Spain	2	2	0	0	19	4	+15	4	5th place game
2	Argentina	2	2	0	0	21	6	+15	4	5th place game
3	Australia	2	1	1	0	14	5	+9	2	7th place game
4	Brazil	2	1	1	0	18	6	+12	2	7th place game
5	Ecuador	2	0	2	0	1	25	−24	0	9th place game
6	Great Britain	2	0	2	0	3	30	−27	0	9th place game

All times are local (UTC+2).

== Ranking and statistics ==
FIRS World Championship winners

United States
2nd title

=== Final ranking ===
The official FIRS final ranking of the tournament:

1st place, gold medalist(s)	United States
2nd place, silver medalist(s)	France
3rd place, bronze medalist(s)	Italy
4	Austria
5	Spain
6	Argentina
7	Brazil
8	Australia
9	Ecuador
10	Great Britain

=== Scoring leaders ===
List shows the top skaters sorted by points, then goals.

Player	GP	G	A	Pts	PIM
(Austria) Andreas Woell	7	10	7	17	0
(Italy) Gianluca Tomasello	7	7	10	17	0
(United States) Dennis LeFevre	7	13	3	16	0
(Brazil) Geraldo Cardoso	7	9	7	16	0
(Spain) Gerard Jimenez	8	11	5	16	0
(Spain) Carlos Del Rosal	8	8	8	16	0
(Austria) Hermann Helm	7	11	3	14	2
(France) Laurent Spinetti	7	10	4	14	0
(Spain) David Cerezo	8	8	4	12	0
(Ecuador) Ricardo Perez	8	6	6	12	0

== See also ==
- FIRS Inline Hockey World Championships
- List of FIRS Senior Men's Inline Hockey World Championships medalists
