= Argentina women's national inline hockey team =

Argentina women's national inline hockey team is the Argentinean national team in Women's Roller in-line hockey. The team competed in the 2013 Women's World Inline Hockey Championships.

== Background ==
The team is nicknamed Las Águilas.

== Players and Coaches ==
In 1996, the team was coached by Aldo Llera. In July 2018, Jorge Otiñano became the coach of the women's national team. This was formally announced at a press conference in August 2018.

== Women's World Inline Hockey Championships ==
=== 1994 ===
They made their international debut in Algarve, Portugal in 1994. They lost 6 - 0 to Brazil and 9 - 2 to Japan at this competition. Their first victory was an 8 - 0 win against Mexico and a 6 - 0 win against Andorra. This set them up to play in the 15th-place ranking match, which they won. The placement was viewed as good as it showed the enthusiasm of the team, which they could use to build on in the future.

=== 1996 ===
The team played in the Group A at the Sertaozinho, Brazil hosted World Championships. The squad included Viviana Foresto, Mariela Foresto, Romina Putelli, Daniela Guerrero and Vanesa Sólimo. Argentina finished third in their group. They lost to Spain 3 - 2, and missed out on the next stage because of goal difference with Italy. They finished the tournament sixth overall.

=== 1998 ===
The 1998 World Championships squad included Viviana Foresto, Mariela Foresto, Romina Putelli, Daniela Guerrero and Vanesa Sólimo. They were coached by Miguel Gomez.

=== 2002 ===
Argentina claimed gold at the German hosted tournament.

=== 2004 ===
Argentina claimed gold at the Portuguese hosted tournament.

=== 2010 ===
Argentina won the 2010 edition after beating host France in the final.

=== 2013 ===
The team competed in the 2013 Women's World Inline Hockey Championships.

=== 2016 ===
The competition was held in Chile. Ahead of the tournament, they played friendly matches against the women's u-20 and u-23 teams. They were coached by Néstor Perea. The roster included Daiana Silva, Verónica Diéguez, Lorena Rodríguez, Salomé Rodríguez, Valentina Fernández, Adriana Gutiérrez, Luciana Agudo and Julieta Fernández. It also included goalkeepers Anabela Flores and Andrea Jara.

== World Roller Games ==
Spain played Argentina in the final of the 2017 World Roller Games in Nanjing, China. Spain came out victorious, winning 7–5 in extra time. Spain went down early on a penalty shot, but the first half ended 3 - 3. Argentina entered the second half with a lot of energy, surprising the Spanish side. Argentina went ahead early in the second half, with the score 3 - 4 in their favor in the 31st minute. Spain scored an equalizer to finish the game tied 4- 4 in regular time. In extra time, Argentina drew ahead against 4 - 5. Spain managed to tie the game back up at 5 -5, demoralizing the Argentinian side. The teams were very evenly matched throughout the game. Valentina Fernández and Adriana Gutiérrez scored two goals a piece in the final, while Andrea Silva scored one. The Argentina side included Andrea Beatris, Maria Lorena Rodríguez, Adriana Gutiérrez, "Luchi" Agudo, Valentina Fernández, Dayana Yanet Silva, and Melisa Salomé Rodríguez.

Earlier in the competition, they played Italy. They also played Portugal. María Silva and Julieta Fernández both scored in their 5–2 win against Portugal. Their performances in these two matches was almost enough to put them in first in Group B. Andrea Jara was the team's goalkeeper during the group stage of the competition.

Argentina played the United States in the quarterfinals. They came out victorious with a 10 - 0 victory with 4 goals from Agustina Fernández, two goals from Adriana Gutiérrez, and Daiana Silva and a penalty conversion from captain Lorena Rodríguez all before the end of the first half, which ended 9 - 0. This set them up for a semifinal match against Germany.

They met Germany in the semifinals, thrashing the Germany side 6 - 1. Their future opponents, Spain, qualified by beating Chile. Andrea Jara, Lorena Rodríguez, Valentina Fernández, Luciana Agudo and Adriana Gutiérrez all played in the match against Germany. Daiana Silva and Valentina Fernandez were early goal scorers in the match against Germany.

Argentina qualified after finishing third at the Chile hosted Roller Hockey Pan American Championships.

The 2017 World Roller Games were the first edition of the event ever to be held, with 10 different roller sports on the program.
