= Italy national hockey team =

Italy national hockey team may refer to:

- Italy men's national ball hockey team
- Italy women's national ball hockey team
- Italy men's national field hockey team
- Italy women's national field hockey team
- Italy men's national ice hockey team
- Italy women's national ice hockey team
- Italy men's national inline hockey team
- Italy women's national inline hockey team
- Italy men's national roller hockey team
- Italy women's national roller hockey team
