= Finland women's national inline hockey team =

- Captain: Minttu Tuominen

World Championship
- Appearances: 8 (first in 2007)
- Best result: 4th (2017)
- Best result: (bronze) (2017)

Medal record

Women's inline hockey

European Championships
Bronze medal – third place	2017 Boskovice	

Finland women's national inline hockey team is the national inline hockey team for Finland. The team finished seventh at the 2011 Women's World Inline Hockey Championships.

== History ==
Finland claimed bronze at the 2017 Women's Inline Hockey European Championship in Boskovice, Czech Republic, the team's first medal in international competition. The roster featured a number of players from the Finnish national ice hockey team, including captain Minttu Tuominen, Annina Rajahuhta, and Susanna Tapani, among others. Aino Karppinen was Finland's top point scorer, earning thirteen points across six games.

Finland returned to the Inline Hockey World Championship in 2018 and rose from the lower division to claim fifth place in the tournament. Tuominen was the leading point scorer of the tournament, notching ten goals and nine assists for a total of 19 points in seven games. She was joined at the top of the scoring board by teammates Marisa Klemola, who ranked second with 17 points, and Mia Heikuri, who ranked fifth with 14 points.

== World Championship results by year ==
Record of the Finnish national team in the women's tournament of the Inline Hockey World Championships, organized by the Fédération Internationale de Roller Sports (FIRS) during 2002 to 2015, and by World Skate during 2016 to present.

Year	Host(s)	GP	W	L	T	GF:GA	+/−	Rank
2002	(United States) Rochester, New York	did not participate						
2003	(Czech Republic) Písek	did not participate						
2004	(Canada) London, Ontario	did not participate						
2005	(France) Paris	did not participate						
2006	(United States) Detroit	did not participate						
2007	(Spain) Bilbao, Basque Country	8	2	6	0	15 : 45	−30	6th
2008	(Germany) Düsseldorf	7	3	4	0	20 : 23	−3	7th
2009	(Italy) Varese	6	2	4	0	18 : 29	−11	7th
2010	(Czech Republic) Beroun	6	2	4	0	23 : 23	0	7th
2011	(Italy) Roccaraso	8	3	5	0	20 : 29	−9	7th
2012	(Colombia) Bucaramanga	did not participate						
2013	(United States) Anaheim, California	did not participate						
2014	(France) Toulouse	did not participate						
2015	(Argentina) Rosario, Santa Fe	7	3	3	1	27 : 16	+11	4th
2016	(Italy) Asiago & Roana	6	4	2	0	39 : 16	+23	6th
2017	(China) Nanjing	did not participate						
2018	(Italy) Asiago & Roana	7	6	0	1	56 : 13	+43	5th
2019	(Spain) Barcelona	did not participate						
