= Australia women's national hockey team =

Australia women's national hockey team may refer to:

- Australia women's national field hockey team
- Australia women's national ice hockey team
- Australia women's national inline hockey team
