= Argentina national hockey team =

Argentina national hockey team may refer to:

- Argentina men's national field hockey team (Los Leones)
- Argentina men's national ice hockey team
- Argentina national roller hockey team
- Argentina women's national field hockey team (Las Leonas)
- Argentina women's national ice hockey team
- Argentina women's national inline hockey team
