= Switzerland national hockey team =

Switzerland national hockey team may refer to:

- Switzerland men's national field hockey team
- Switzerland men's national ice hockey team
  - Switzerland men's national junior ice hockey team
  - Switzerland men's national under-18 ice hockey team
- Switzerland women's national ice hockey team
  - Switzerland women's national under-18 ice hockey team
- Switzerland men's national inline hockey team
- Switzerland national roller hockey team
