= United States national hockey team =

United States national hockey team may refer to:

- United States men's national ball hockey team
- United States women's national ball hockey team
- United States men's national field hockey team
- United States women's national field hockey team
- United States men's national ice hockey team
  - United States men's national junior ice hockey team
  - USA Hockey National Team Development Program
- United States women's national ice hockey team
  - United States women's national under-18 ice hockey team
- United States men's national inline hockey team
- United States women's national inline hockey team
- United States national roller hockey team
