= Australia national hockey team =

Australia national hockey team may refer to:

- Australia men's national field hockey team (Kookaburras)
- Australia women's national field hockey team (Hockeyroos)
- Australia men's national ice hockey team (Mighty Roos)
- Australia women's national ice hockey team (Mighty Jills)
- Australia men's national inline hockey team
- Australia women's national inline hockey team
