= Iran men's national hockey team =

Iran men's national hockey team may refer to:

- Iran men's national field hockey team
- Iran men's national ice hockey team
- Iran men's national inline hockey team
