= Germany national hockey team =

Germany national hockey team may refer to:

- Germany men's national ball hockey team
- Germany men's national field hockey team
- Germany women's national field hockey team
- Germany men's national ice hockey team
- Germany women's national ice hockey team
- Germany men's national ice sledge hockey team
- Germany men's national inline hockey team
- Germany women's national inline hockey team
- Germany national roller hockey team
