= Finland national hockey team =

Finland national hockey team may refer to:

- Finland men's national field hockey team
- Finland men's national ice hockey team
  - Finland men's national junior ice hockey team
  - Finland men's national under-18 ice hockey team
- Finland women's national ice hockey team
  - Finland women's national under-18 ice hockey team
- Finland men's national inline hockey team
- Finland women's national inline hockey team
