= IHWC (disambiguation) =

IHWC is the acronym for the Ice Hockey World Championships, an annual international men's ice hockey tournament organized by the International Ice Hockey Federation (IIHF).

IHWC may also refer to:

- World Skate Inline Hockey World Championships, an annual international inline hockey tournament organized by the Fédération Internationale de Roller Sports (FIRS)
- IIHF Inline Hockey World Championship, an annual international inline hockey tournament organized by the International Ice Hockey Federation (IIHF)
- Indoor Hockey World Cup, an annual international indoor field hockey tournament organized by the International Hockey Federation (FIH)
