= New Zealand women's national inline hockey team =

New Zealand
- Nickname: Inline Ferns
- Association: Inline Hockey New Zealand
- General manager: Courtney Fox
- Head coach: Steven Adams
- Team colors

New Zealand women's national inline hockey team, nicknamed the Inline Ferns, is the national women's inline hockey team of New Zealand.

The team competed in the 2013 FIRS Inline Hockey World Championships, placing second.

The New Zealand women's national Inline hockey team competed at the FIRS Inline Hockey World Championships in 2014 in France.

In 2015 the Inline Ferns competed at NARCh in California and placed third in the women's gold division (6th overall), with an average age of 19 years.

At the 2016 FIRS Inline Hockey World Championships hosted in Italy, the team placed 13th overall, 5th in division 2.

At the 2017 FIRS Inline Hockey World Championships held in China the New Zealand Senior Women placed 6th.

At the 2017 FIRS Inline Hockey World Championships held in China the New Zealand Senior Women placed 6th.

The Inline Ferns competed at the 2018 Inline Hockey World Championships in Italy, finishing in 7th position.
