= 2019 World Roller Games =

Athletic competition

- Host city: Barcelona
- Country: Spain
- Dates: 29 June-14 July
- Website: https://www.worldskate.org/wrg2019.html

The 2019 World Roller Games was the second edition of the World Roller Games. It took place from June 29, 2019, to July 14, 2019, in Barcelona, Spain. A total of 117 competitions were held during the event. In addition to the main venue in Barcelona, events took place at four additional locations within the province of Barcelona: Mollet del Vallès, Terrassa, Sant Cugat del Vallès and Vilanova i la Geltrú.

The event combined the world championships of multiple roller sports disciplines, including inline skating, roller skating, and skateboarding. Approximately 4,120 athletes from 81 national federations participated, competing across eleven disciplines.

== Participants ==
Participants
Africa (15)	Americas (17)	Asia (14)	Europe (33)	Oceania (2)
Angola Benin Burkina Faso Republic of the Congo Ivory Coast Egypt Guinea Kenya Morocco Mozambique Namibia Nigeria Senegal South Africa Sudan	Argentina Brazil Canada Chile Colombia Costa Rica Cuba Dominican Republic Ecuador El Salvador United States Guatemala Mexico Paraguay Peru Uruguay Venezuela	Bangladesh China South Korea Hong Kong India Indonesia Iran Israel Japan Macau Malaysia Pakistan Thailand Chinese Taipei	Germany Andorra Austria Belarus Belgium Bulgaria Croatia Czech Republic Denmark Slovakia Slovenia Spain Estonia Finland France England Hungary Ireland Italy Latvia Lithuania Norway Netherlands Poland Portugal Romania Russia San Marino Serbia Sweden Switzerland Turkey Ukraine	Australia New Zealand

== Competitions ==
=== Schedule ===
Opening Ceremony	Competition Days	Award Days	Closing Ceremony

June-July	29	30	1	2	3	4	5	6	7	8	9	10	11	12	13	14
Ceremonies																
Inline Roller Hockey																
Roller Hockey																
Speed Skating																
Alpine Skiing																
Figure Skating																
Freestyle Skating																
Roller derby																
Freestyle slalom																
Skateboarding																
Descent																
June-July	29	30	1	2	3	4	5	6	7	8	9	10	11	12	13	14

== Medal table ==
* Host nation (Spain)

Rank	Nation	Gold	Silver	Bronze	Total
1	Italy	21	18	24	63
2	Colombia	21	16	6	43
3	Germany	11	9	17	37
4	United States	11	5	0	16
5	Spain*	10	12	11	33
6	China	7	3	4	14
7	Belgium	6	2	4	12
8	Chinese Taipei	5	9	8	22
9	Russia	5	4	2	11
10	France	4	8	9	21
11	Brazil	3	3	3	9
12	Portugal	2	3	5	10
13	Australia	1	3	2	6
14	South Korea	1	2	3	6
15	Japan	1	2	2	5
16	Czech Republic	1	2	0	3
16	Latvia	1	2	0	3
18	Senegal	1	1	1	3
19	Canada	1	0	2	3
20	India	1	0	0	1
20	Thailand	1	0	0	1
22	Argentina	0	5	1	6
23	Iran	0	1	2	3
24	Mexico	0	1	1	2
25	Netherlands	0	1	0	1
25	Paraguay	0	1	0	1
25	Ukraine	0	1	0	1
28	Chile	0	0	2	2
28	Ecuador	0	0	2	2
30	Belarus	0	0	1	1
30	Guatemala	0	0	1	1
30	Poland	0	0	1	1
30	Romania	0	0	1	1
30	Slovakia	0	0	1	1
Totals (34 entries)		115	114	116	345
