= Brazil women's national inline hockey team =

The Brazil women's national inline hockey team is the national team for Brazil. The team competed in the 2013 Women's World Inline Hockey Championships, the 2014 FIRS Inline Hockey World Championships and at the 2024 Women's World Inline Hockey Championships.
