= World Skate Games =

International biennial multi-sport event

- Abbreviation: WSG
- Purpose: To conduct multi-sport events for roller sports
- Frequency: Every 2 years
- Inaugurated: 2017, by World Skate
- Most recent: 2024 (Rome, Novara, Pescara, and Rimini in Italy)
- Next event: 2026 Asunción
- President: Sabatino Aracu
- Website: World Skate.org

The World Skate Games (formerly World Roller Games) are an international biennial multi-sport event, comprising all the world roller sport disciplines as regulated by the World Skate international federation. The games involve 11 World Championships in one multi-sport event.

Due to the 2022 Russian invasion of Ukraine, World Skate banned Russian and Belarusian athletes and officials from its competitions, and did not stage any events in Russia or Belarus in 2022.

== Disciplines ==
The 2026 World Skate Games include the following disciplines:

- Skateboarding
  - Park
  - Street
  - Vert
- Roller freestyle
  - Park
  - Street
  - Vert
- Scootering
  - Park
  - Street
- Downhill
  - Inline downhill
  - Skateboarding downhill
  - Street luge
- Slalom
  - Inline slalom/Alpine skating
  - Skateboarding slalom
- Skate cross
- Inline freestyle
- Speed
  - Track
  - Road
  - Marathon
- Inline hockey
- Rink hockey
- Roller derby
- Artistic skating
- E-sport

== Editions ==
Year	Event	Location
2017	World Roller Games	(China) Nanjing
2019	World Roller Games	(Spain) Barcelona, Mollet del Vallès, Terrassa, Sant Cugat del Vallès and Vilanova i la Geltrú
2022	World Skate Games	(Argentina) Buenos Aires and San Juan
2024	World Skate Games	(Italy) Rome, Novara, Pescara and Rimini
2026	World Skate Games	(Paraguay) Asunción

== 2017 World Roller Games ==
The 2017 World Roller Games was the first edition of the World Roller Games. It took place from August 27, 2017, to September 10, 2017, in Nanjing, China. It comprised the World Championships in 10 disciplines. Sixty-one countries were represented at the games, with Colombia topping the medals table with 25 gold medals, followed by Italy with 20 gold medals then France with 10. This event included the World Championships of 10 Roller Sports during a 15-day skating festival: 10 sports, 61 national federations, 193 national teams, and over 3000 athletes.

== 2019 World Roller Games ==
The 2019 World Roller Games was the second edition of the World Roller Games. It took place from June 29, 2019, to July 14, 2019, in Barcelona, Spain. It comprised the World Championships in 11 disciplines. Eighty one countries were represented at the games with a total of 4,120 athletes competing. In total, the 11 days of the World Roller Games were held in front of 140,000 fans. Italy topped the medal table with 21 golds, 18 silver and 24 bronze. Colombia also won 21 golds but their 16 silver and six bronze left them second.

== 2022 World Skate Games ==
Argentina was chosen to host the 2021 World Roller Games. The World Skate Executive Board, that met on 30 April 2019, unanimously entrusted Argentina with the task of organizing the World Skate Games that will take place in Buenos Aires, Vicente López and San Juan between October and November 2021.

Due to the Covid-19 pandemic the event was postponed from 2021 to 2022, and will be held October 24 to November 13. The opening ceremony held in Buenos Aires and the closing ceremony in San Juan. With the increased importance of skateboarding within the international federation World Skate, the event now goes under the name World Skate Games, and covers skateboarding, roller skating and scooter.

== 2024 World Skate Games ==
The 2024 World Skate Games were held in Rome, Novara, Pescara, and Rimini in Italy from 6 to 22 September 2024.

== 2026 World Skate Games ==
The 2026 World Skate Games will be held in Asunción in Paraguay from 2 to 18 October 2026.
