= France women's national inline hockey team =

France women's national inline hockey team is the national team for France. The team finished first at the 2021 FIRS Inline Hockey World Championships.
