= 2017 World Roller Games =

Athletic competition

- Host city: Nanjing
- Country: China
- Dates: 27 August-10 September

The 2017 World Roller Games was the first edition of the World Roller Games. It took place from August 27, 2017, to September 10, 2017, in Nanjing, China. The event brought together the world champions of the various roller skating disciplines (inline skates, roller skates or skateboards), with the participation of nearly 4,000 athletes from fifty-seven national federations, distributed in ten disciplines.

== Choice of Venue ==
The first edition of the World Roller Games was initially awarded to the city of Barcelona. However, due to organizational challenges, Barcelona's hosting of the event was postponed to 2019. Consequently, the inaugural edition of the games in 2017 was held in Nanjing, China. Nanjing had previously hosted the 2014 Youth Olympic Games and the 2016 World Speed Skating Championship, providing existing facilities suitable for skating competitions.

== Infrastructure ==
Nanjing had previously hosted the 2014 Youth Olympic Games, the 2016 World Speed Skating Championships, and various other international sporting events, and thus had existing infrastructure suitable for the competition. Events were distributed across seven venues. The Nanjing Olympic Sports Center Gymnasium served exclusively as the location for the opening ceremony, with no competitive events held at this venue.

- The Wutaishan Gymnasium, located in the Gulou district, is part of the Wutaishan Sports Center complex. The venue previously hosted the 2002 Women's Basketball World Championship. Its main hall measures 28 meters by 48 meters. Additional facilities within the gymnasium include a conference room, a VIP area, and dressing rooms, which during the World Roller Games were used by figure skaters for costume preparation.
- The Longjiang Gymnasium, located in the Gulou district, hosted part of the field hockey events, which were conducted across two venues. Previously, the facility hosted the 2010 Women's Wrestling World Cup, the 2013 Asian Youth Games, and events during the 2014 Youth Olympic Games. The gymnasium has a seating capacity of 3,000 and a total floor area of 14,000 square meters, including its main hall.
- The Nanjing University of Technology Gymnasium, located in the Pukou district, served as the second venue for field hockey competitions. The facility, larger than the Longjiang Gymnasium, has a height of nearly 24 meters and a seating capacity of 4,454 spectators. The gymnasium can accommodate two reduced-size field hockey rinks, each measuring 38.6 meters in length (compared to the standard 40 meters and the minimum regulation length of 36 meters). The venue previously hosted events during the 2013 Asian Youth Games.
- The Jubaoshan Sports Park, located in the Xuanwu district, covers an area of 147 hectares. The venue hosted the downhill and alpine skating events. The downhill track measures 600 meters in length and 6 meters in width, while the alpine skating course is 400 meters long. Attendance at these competitions was free of charge for spectators.
- The Youth Olympic Sports Park, located in the Pukou district, hosted competitions in three disciplines: freestyle skating, roller field hockey, and roller derby. The sports complex covers an area exceeding 170,000 square meters. Roller field hockey events took place in the main hall, which accommodates two courts. Freestyle skating competitions were held in an adjacent hall measuring 30 meters by 50 meters, featuring seating for 500 spectators on its second floor, situated between the main arena and the gymnasium. Additionally, roller derby competitions were conducted on an indoor floor installed specifically for this purpose, with installation completed in June 2017. The venue also included the athletes' village within an adjoining 180,000-square-meter park area.
- The Nanjing Sports Training Center, located in the Pukou district, previously hosted several events during the 2014 Youth Olympic Games and the 2016 World Speed Skating Championships. The facility has a seating capacity of 2,000 spectators and covers an area of 87,054 square meters. The venue hosted speed skating events, featuring a 200-meter track and a 500-meter road course, each 8 meters wide. The marathon competition was conducted on a loop course measuring 10.58 kilometers.
- The Sports Laboratory, located in the Jianye district, hosted skateboarding and freestyle skating events. The facility covers a total area of 12,000 square meters and includes a skate park measuring 752.4 square meters. Freestyle skating events were conducted within an indoor area measuring 30 meters by 45 meters. The site also included a skateboard ramp measuring 4.5 meters high and 21 meters wide, constructed from nearly 22 tons of steel. The venue previously served as a competition site during the Youth Olympic Games.

== Modalities ==
- Descent on Skates
- Roller Hockey
- Inline Hockey
- Aggressive Skating ("freestyle" or radical skating)
- Alpine Skating
- Roller Figure Skating
- Speed Skating on Inline Skates (track and route)
- Freestyle Slalom
- Roller Derby
- Skateboarding

== Participants ==
Participants
Africa (12)	Americas (9)	Asia (14)	Europe (20)	Oceania (2)
Angola; Benin; Democratic Republic of the Congo; Ivory Coast; Egypt; Guinea; Kenya; Mozambique; Namibia; Senegal; South Africa; Tanzania	Argentina; Brazil; Canada; Chile; Colombia; Ecuador; United States; Guatemala; Mexico	Bangladesh; China; South Korea; Hong Kong; India; Indonesia; Iran; Israel; Japan; Macau; Malaysia; Pakistan; Thailand; Chinese Taipei	Germany; Austria; Belgium; Croatia; Czech Republic; Denmark; Slovakia; Slovenia; Spain; France; England; Hungary; Italy; Latvia; Netherlands; Poland; Portugal; Russia; Sweden; Switzerland	Australia; New Zealand

== Schedule ==
Opening ceremony	Event competitions	Medal events	Closing ceremony

August-September	27	28	29	30	31	1	2	3	4	5	6	7	8	9	10
Ceremonies															
Inline hockey															
Rink hockey															
Speed															
Alpine															
Artistic															
Free style															
Roller derby															
Slalom															
Skateboarding															
Downhill															
August-September	27	28	29	30	31	1	2	3	4	5	6	7	8	9	10

== Medal table ==
* Host nation (China)

Rank	Nation	Gold	Silver	Bronze	Total
1	Colombia	25	13	10	48
2	Italy	20	25	31	76
3	France	10	10	3	23
4	Germany	9	8	9	26
5	China*	9	5	3	17
6	Spain	5	10	7	22
7	United States	5	3	0	8
8	Chinese Taipei	4	8	12	24
9	Portugal	4	4	2	10
10	Russia	3	4	1	8
11	South Korea	2	7	8	17
12	Argentina	2	3	6	11
13	Senegal	2	0	0	2
14	Belgium	1	2	5	8
15	Iran	1	1	1	3
16	Australia	1	1	0	2
16	Japan	1	1	0	2
16	Thailand	1	1	0	2
19	Chile	1	0	1	2
19	Latvia	1	0	1	2
21	Brazil	1	0	0	1
21	Venezuela	1	0	0	1
23	Czech Republic	0	1	1	2
24	India	0	1	0	1
24	Mexico	0	1	0	1
26	Ecuador	0	0	2	2
26	Poland	0	0	2	2
28	Canada	0	0	1	1
28	Great Britain	0	0	1	1
28	New Zealand	0	0	1	1
28	Switzerland	0	0	1	1
Totals (31 entries)		109	109	109	327
