= Iran men's national inline hockey team =

Iran national inline hockey team
- League: Islamic Republic of Iran Skating Federation
- Based in: Tehran
- Stadium: Enghelab Sports Complex
- Broadcasters: IRIB Varzesh
- Website: IRSF; Official Team Instagram

Iran men's national inline hockey team is the national team side of Iran at international inline hockey.

== Tournaments ==
=== Asian Roller Skating Championship – Inline Hockey International Cup ===
Year/Host	Rank
(Japan) 2004 Akita	Last
(South Korea) 2005 Jeonju	Did not enter
(India) 2007 Calcutta	Third place
(China) 2010 Dalian	Second Place
(China) 2012 Hefei	Third place
(China) 2014 Haining	Fourth place
(China) 2016 Lishui	Third place
(South Korea) 2018 Namwon	First Place

=== FIRS World Championship ===
Year/Host	Rank	Pld	W	T	L
(Germany) 2008 Ratingen	17th	8	0	1	7
(Italy) 2011 Roccaraso	15th	7	2	0	5
(Italy) 2016 Asiago, Roana	14th	7	3	1	3
Total (3/?)	-	22	5	2	15
