= Namibia women's national inline hockey team =

Namibia women's national inline hockey team is the national team for Namibia. The team competed in the 2013 Women's World Inline Hockey Championships.
