= Czech Republic women's national inline hockey team =

Czech Republic women's national inline hockey team is the national women's inline hockey team for Czech Republic. The team finished fifth at the 2011 Women's World Inline Hockey Championships.
