= Colombia women's national inline hockey team =

Colombia women's national inline hockey team is the national inline hockey team for Colombia. The team competed in the 2013 Women's World Inline Hockey Championships.
