= Germany women's national inline hockey team =

National team for Germany in the sport of inline hockey

Germany women's national inline hockey team is the national team for Germany. The team finished eighth at the 2011 Women's World Inline Hockey Championships. The team competed in the 2013 Women's World Inline Hockey Championships.
