= Freestyle inline skating =

Form of roller skating

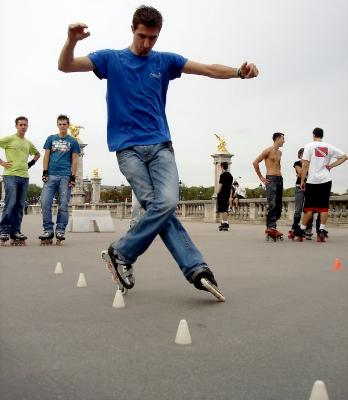
Freestyle skaters in action at Les Invalides, Paris

Inline freestyle skating is a highly technical field of inline skating that involves performing tricks around a straight line of equally spaced cones. The three spacings used in competitions are 80 centimetres (31 in), 50 cm (20 in) and 120 cm (47 in).

== Disciplines ==
=== Classic slalom ===
Freestyle slalom skaters use inline skates, with some variations. The skates use a rocker configuration, however there are other variations of the rocker set-up that exist. The rocker setup is where only 2 wheels are touching the floor at any point in time, usually with a 2 mm height difference between the higher and lower wheels. Flat setups, where all four wheels touch the ground are rare.

There are two common ways to rocker the wheels. Firstly, is by putting larger wheels in the center and smaller wheels on each end. An example of this is having 80 mm wheels in the 2nd and 3rd position and 76 mm in the front and back. The second method is having a rockered frame. The frame uses the same sized wheel for all 4 wheels with the height difference built into the frame.

The frame length (230–245 mm) is determined by shoe size or preference. Inline skates used for slalom have a snug to tight fit, and a stiff cuff to give sustained ankle support.

Skaters perform routines set to music, consisting of many tricks in sequence. Classic slalom routines are judged on their technicality, artistic expression, and the execution of the tricks involved.

=== Slalom pair ===
Similar to classic slalom, but skaters skate in pairs. Synchronization is part of the score.

=== Slalom battle ===
Same technique as classic slalom, but skaters compete in groups of 3 to 4, with the two best advancing to the next round.

=== Speed slalom ===
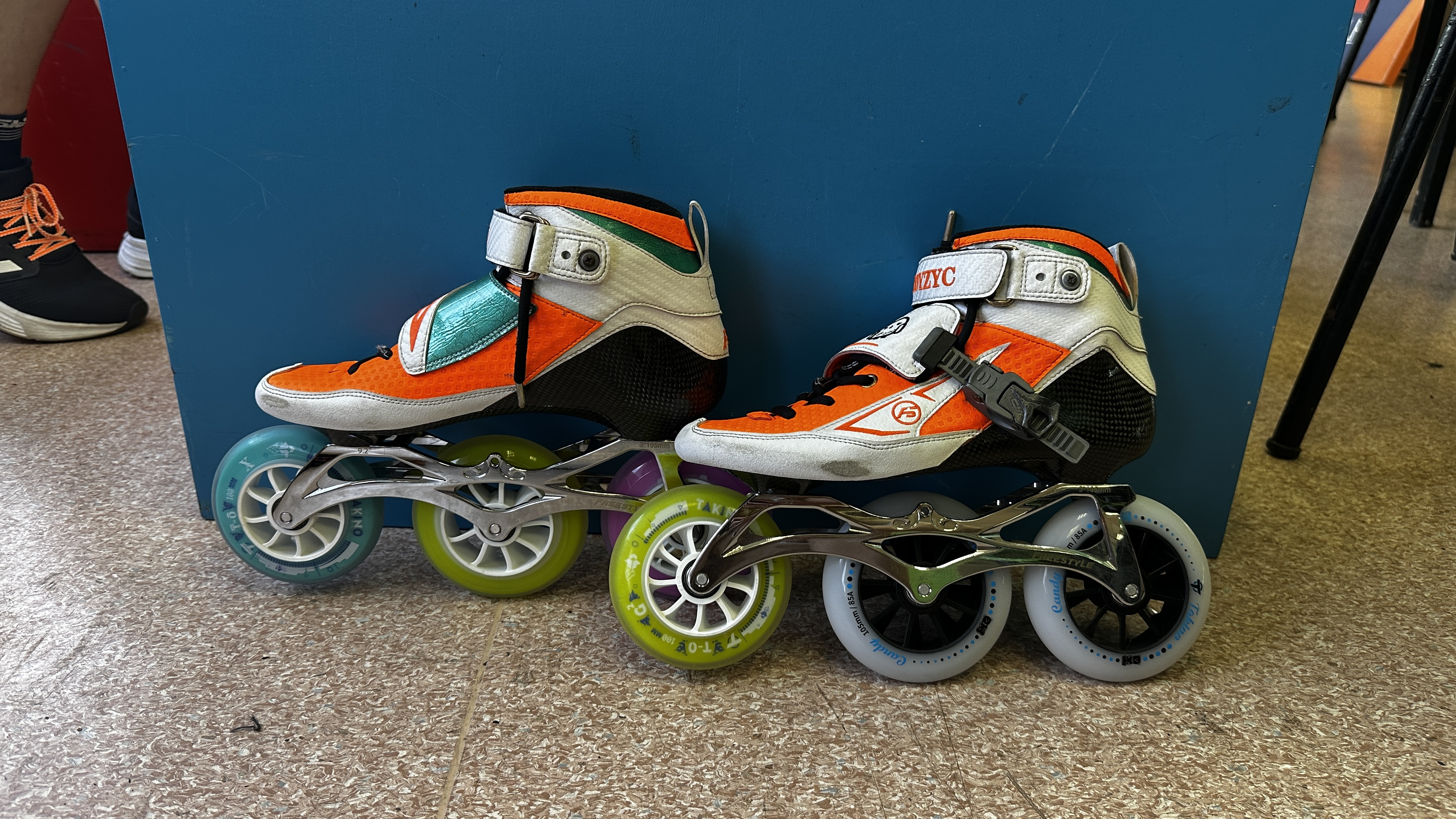
Custom 3-wheel speed slalom skates

Speed slalom involves moving through a line of twenty cones, usually on one foot. In amateur competitions, the Snake or Fish formations may also be used. Skaters have a 12-metre run-up to the cones, spaced 80 cm apart.

A laser beam break timer is typically used to precisely measure the speed of the contestant.

Speed slalom skates typically have three wheels rather than four, to increase manoeuvrability and reduce contact with the ground.

=== Freestyle slide ===
In a 40 m long track, the skaters slide in groups of 3 to 4, with the two best advancing to the next round. The first 20 m are for accelerating and the last 20 m, with cones every 1 m, are for sliding.

=== Free jump ===
Skaters jump over a horizontal bar, in incremental heights from 0.40 m to 1.80 m. Similar to athletics' high jump.

== List of slalom moves ==
The list of basic moves from easiest to hardest. There are many more moves than the ones shown in the list, and many variations on how to complete each move. The names of these moves may differ between communities.

A full list of tricks recognised by World Skate can be found here in the regulations.

Basic

- Forwards Parallel (Fish)
- Forwards Monoline (Snake)
- Forwards Criss-Cross
- Alternating Forwards Cross
- Double Cross
- Forwards One Foot

Beginner

- Backwards Monoline (Snake)
- Backwards Criss-Cross
- Backwards Parallel (Fish)
- Forwards Heel-Toe Snake
- Forwards Heel-Toe Criss-Cross
- Forwards Toe-Toe Snake
- Forwards Heel-Heel Snake
- Forwards Shifted Cross
- Backwards Shifted Cross
- Eagle
- Eagle Cross (Independent)
- Eagle Shifted Cross (Wave)
- Eagle Royal
- Eagle Royal Cross
- Reverse Eagle
- Reverse Eagle Criss-Cross
- Reverse Eagle Shifted Cross
- Fake Side-Surf

Intermediate

- Crazy
- Grapevine (Mabrouk)
- Double Crazy
- Double Crazy Back
- Forwards Stroll
- Backwards Stroll
- Backwards One Foot
- Chapi Chapo
- X
- X 2
- X Jump (Crab Cross)
- Nelson
- Nelson Back
- Nelson Transfer Back (X-Back)
- Sun
- Miniman (Small car 5 Wheels Sitting)
- Pendulum

Advanced

- Alternating Cross
- Crazy Sun
- Mexican
- Italian
- Volte
- Wiper
- Footspin
- Special
- Oliver
- Brush
- Chicken Leg
- Cobra
- Butterfly

Master

- Rocket (Coffee Machine)
- Backwards Rocket
- Christie
- Kasatchok
- Toe Wheeling
- Grabbed Toe Wheeling
- Heel Wheeling
- Grabbed Heel Wheeling
- Screw
- Leaf
- Swan
- Deckchair (Corvo)

== Competitions ==
The World Slalom Series Association (WSSA) organised the first World Championships in inline freestyle in 2008. The competition has been held annually since then and in 2015, World Skate recognized it as an official world championships from the organization, known as the Inline Freestyle World Championship. This competition has been part of the World Skate Games since 2017. As of 2024 WSSA no longer organizes major calendar competitions in inline freestyle.

World Skate currently hosts all competitions and ranks skaters based on their performances. There are a range of types of competitions, from local, to continental, and international.
