= 2022 World Skate Games =

Athletic competition

- Country: Argentina
- Dates: 24 October-13 November

The 2022 World Skate Games was the third edition of the World Skate Games. It took place from 24 October to 13 November 2022 in Argentina.

Argentina was chosen to host the 2021 World Roller Games. The World Skate Executive Board, that met on 30 April 2019, unanimously entrusted Argentina with the task of organizing the World Skate Games that will take place in Buenos Aires, Vicente López and San Juan between October and November 2021.

Due to the Covid-19 pandemic the event was postponed from 2021 to 2022, and will be held October 24 to November 13. The opening ceremony held in Buenos Aires and the closing ceremony in San Juan. With the increased importance of skateboarding within the international federation World Skate, the event now goes under the name World Skate Games, and covers skateboarding, roller skating and scooter.
