= Australia women's national inline hockey team =

Australia women's national inline hockey team is the national team for Australia. The team finished tenth at the 2011 Women's World Inline Hockey Championships. The team competed in the 2013 Women's World Inline Hockey Championships. Their most notable achievement, was winning the bronze medal at the 2002 FIRS Women's Inline Hockey World Championships.
