= Italy women's national inline hockey team =

Italy women's national inline hockey team is the national team for Italy. The team finished ninth at the 2011 Women's World Inline Hockey Championships.
