= United States women's national inline hockey team =

National sports team

United States women's national inline hockey team is the national team for the United States. The team finished first at the 2011 Women's World Inline Hockey Championships. The team competed in the 2013 Women's World Inline Hockey Championships.
