= Roana =

- Comune
- Comune di Roana
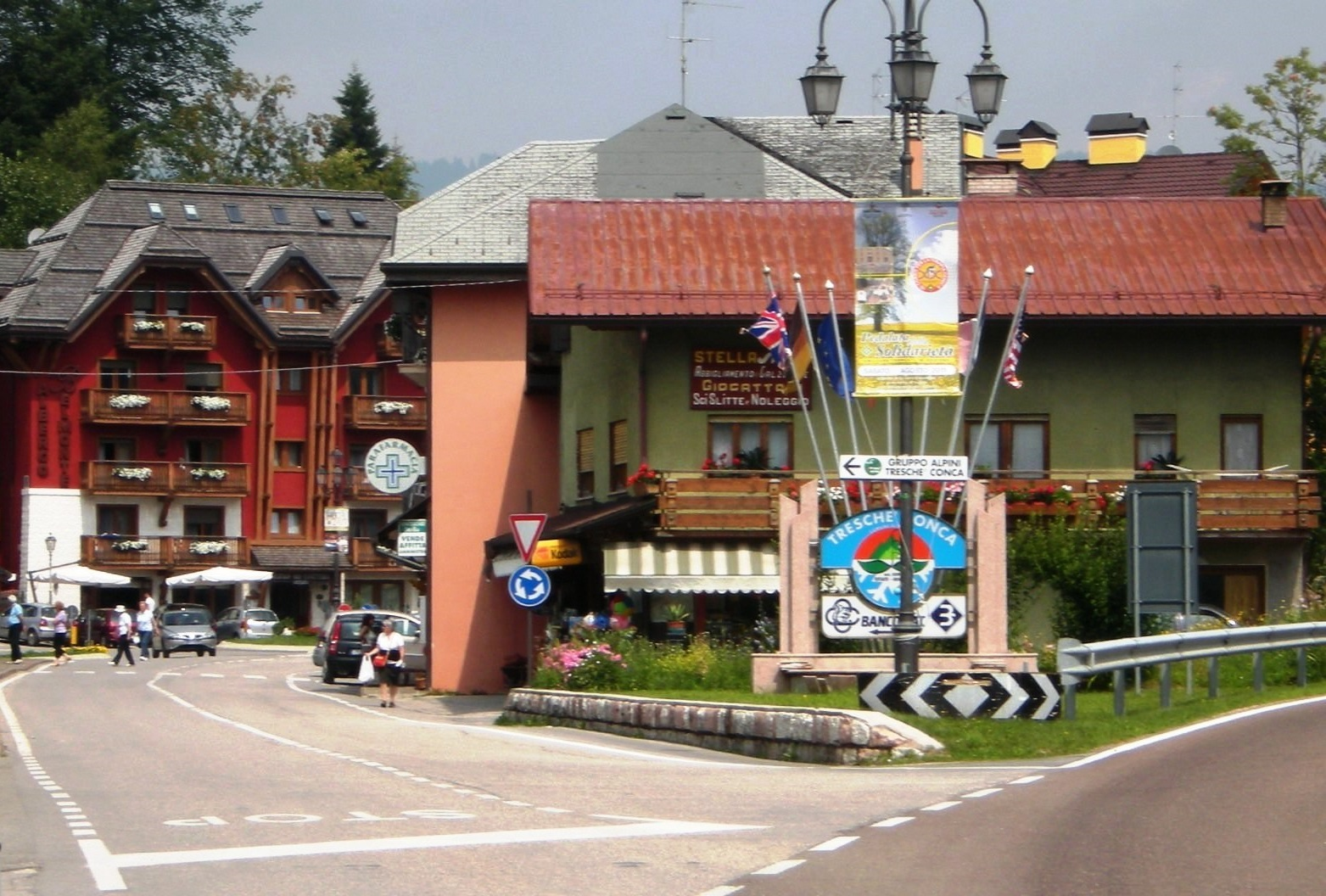
- View of the Frazione of Treschè Conca.

- Coat of arms

- Location within Italy Location within Veneto
- Coordinates: 45°53′N 11°28′E
- Country: Italy
- Region: Veneto
- Province: Vicenza (VI)
- Frazioni: Camporovere, Canove, Cesuna, Mezzaselva, Roana, Treschè Conca

Government
  - Mayor: Valentino Frigo

Area
  - Total: 78.13 km^{2} (30.17 sq mi)
- Elevation: 1,001 m (3,284 ft)

Population (31 December 2015)
  - Total: 4,321
  - Density: 55.31/km^{2} (143.2/sq mi)
- Demonym: Roanesi / Robaanar
- Time zone: UTC+1 (CET)
  - Summer (DST): UTC+2 (CEST)
- Postal code: 36010
- Dialing code: 0424
- ISTAT code: 024085
- Patron saint: St. Justina of Padua
- Saint day: 7 October
- Website: Official website

Roana (Cimbrian: Robàan) is a comune on the Asiago Plateau, in the province of Vicenza, Veneto, Italy. It is West of SP249 road.

The comune consists of six villages (in Italian "frazioni"), also referred to as the six bell towers, since each town has its own church; spread over a total area of 7,838 hectares: Camporovere, Canove, Cesuna, Mezzaselva, Roana and Tresché Conca.

The town hall is located in Canove. Roana is one of the Sette Comuni Vicentini where the Cimbrian language was traditionally spoken.

Within the territory of the municipality of Roana there are sports infrastructures, acrobatic parks, a small lake, ski facilities, and museums, such as the Museum of the Great War in Canove, regarding World War I, since many battles were fought on the Asiago plateau.

== Cimbrian heritage ==
Roana is one of the municipalities on the plateau that preserves the Cimbrian heritage, which comes from a Germanic culture that settled in the area during the Middle Ages. In Roana there is the Cimbrian Cultural Institute (Istituto di Cultura Cimbra), which is dedicated to preserving and promoting the language, traditions, and history of the Cimbrian people, and a museum dedicated to retrieving and studying Cimbro artifacts, with the support of the Veneto region.

Each summer Roana celebrates Hoga Zait, a festival which showcases traditional Cimbrian music, dances, and folklore. This event highlights the cultural identity of the region and attracts visitors from across Italy and beyond.

== Roana Great War museum ==
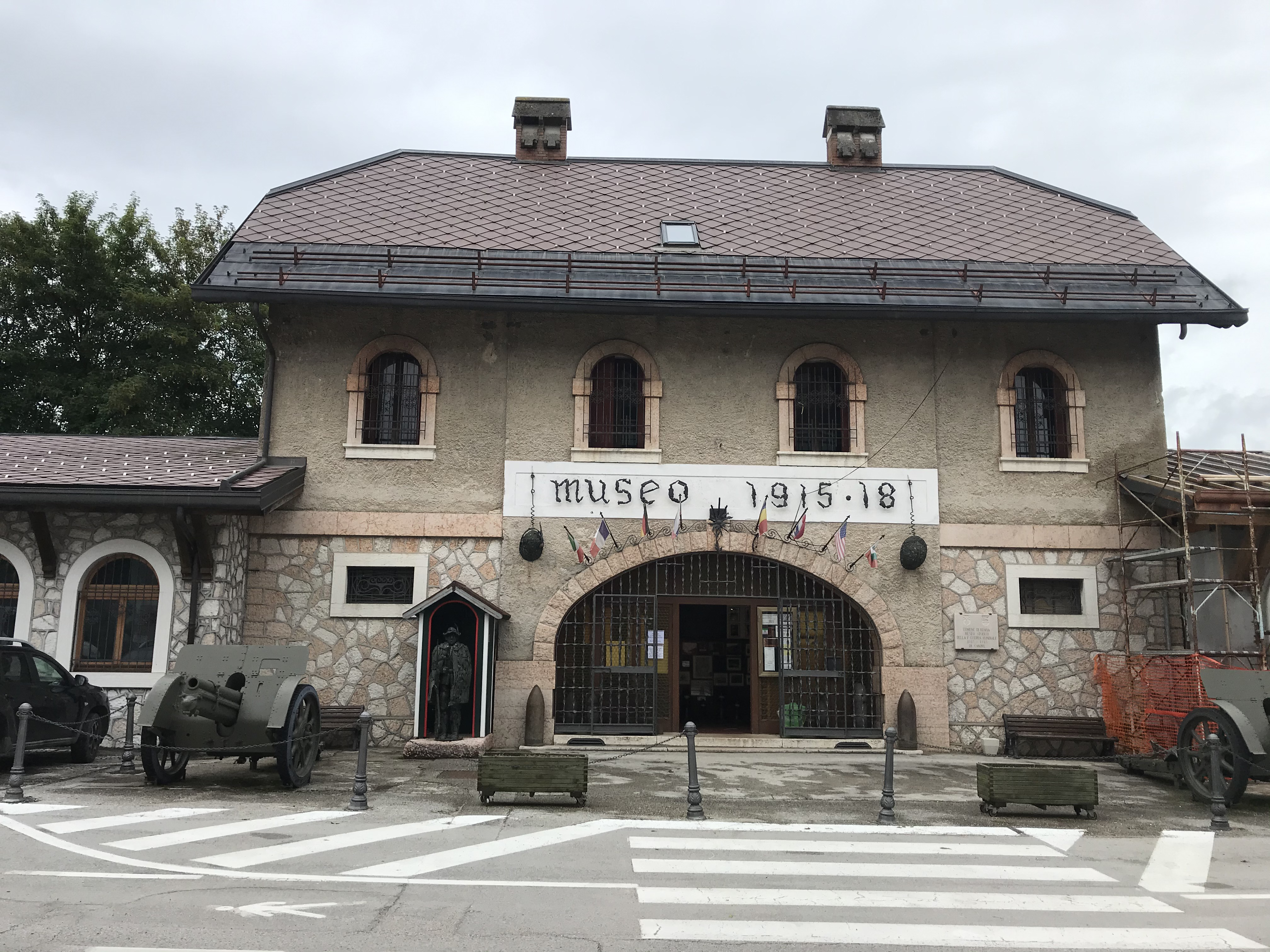
Roana (VI) - Canove district - Great War Museum 1915-18 (former railway station)

The Canove District History Museum is dedicated to preserving the history of World War I and its impact on the local area. Inaugurated in 1974, the museum was built on the site of the former railway station, thanks to the efforts of a group of local inhabitants. The exhibition includes over 8,500 artifacts, featuring an extensive array of weapons and military equipment. It contains over 2,000 photographs, depicting the lives of soldiers during the war, showing them in combat and performing various tasks such as building roads, digging trenches, constructing aqueducts, mountain cableways, hospitals, and cemeteries. During World War I over 1,500 kilometers of roads were built, making it one of the highest densities in the world, along with hundreds of tunnels, trenches, and paths. The museum also displays medals, clothes, and decorations awarded to the soldiers who fought on local mountains such as Monte Cengio, Monte Zovetto, Monte Lémerle, and Monte Ortigara. Other items in the collection were either discovered on the plateau or belonged to private collections. In recognition of its historical significance, the Ministry of Defence has assigned two cannons and numerous artifacts to the museum. All the weapons and ammunition have been demilitarised by the Military Arsenal of Verona. A significant item in the museum's collection is a 420-millimeter Austrian bullet, which was shot from Barbara cannon in Trento and was found unexploded. It was the largest caliber used in the area. The chandeliers inside the museum were built by using war relics from different objects, such as bayonets, nails, helmets, crampons, rifle barrels, and chains.

== Twin towns ==
Roana is twinned with:

- Pojana Maggiore, Italy
- Velden, Germany
