= Canada men's national inline hockey team =

National roller hockey team

Medal record

Men's Inline Hockey

IIHF InLine Hockey World Championship
Gold medal – first place	1998 - Anaheim	Top Division
Gold medal – first place	2008 - Bratislava	Division I
Gold medal – first place	2012 - Ingolstadt	Top Division
Gold medal – first place	2015 - Tampere	Top Division
Silver medal – second place	1996 - Minneapolis	Top Division
Silver medal – second place	1997 - Anaheim	Top Division
Silver medal – second place	2014 Pardubice	Top Division
Bronze medal – third place	2011 Pardubice	Top Division
Bronze medal – third place	2013 - Dresden	Division I

FIRS Inline Hockey World Championships
Gold medal – first place	2002 - Rochester	
Silver medal – second place	1995 - Chicago	
Silver medal – second place	1997 - Zell am See	
Silver medal – second place	2004 - London	
Silver medal – second place	2009 - Varese	
Silver medal – second place	2012 - Bucaramanga	
Bronze medal – third place	2003 - Pisek	
Bronze medal – third place	2006 - Detroit	
Bronze medal – third place	2007 - Bilbao	

PanAm Games
Silver medal – second place	2003 - Santo Domingo	

World Games
Silver medal – second place	2005 - Duisburg	

The Canadian men's national inline hockey team is the national team for Canada, based in Lethbridge, Alberta (Roller Hockey Canada) and Richmond Hill, Ontario (Inline Canada). The team is controlled by Roller Hockey Canada (previous known as: the National Inline Hockey Association - Canada) for IIHF events and Inline Canada for FIRS events.

== History ==
Initially, the Canadian national team was administered by Hockey Canada. It made an appearance in the first three IIHF Inline Hockey World Championships, winning silver in 1996 and 1997. In 1998, the Canadian squad defeated the two-time world Champions United States, in the gold medal game to win the first gold medal in country history. Following the 1998 World Championships, Canada withdrew from international competition. Hockey Canada shut down their inline hockey program in 2000.

Following Hockey Canada's shut down of their program, two separate governing bodies emerged. Roller Hockey Canada (previous known as: The National Inline Hockey Association - Canada) for IIHF related events and the Canadian Inline Hockey Association, which became Inline Canada in 2003 for all FIRS related events. The two programs are both recognized by certain bodies as Canada's national inline hockey team. Roller Hockey Canada (NIHA-Canada) is recognized by Hockey Canada and USA Hockey as the national team. Inline Canada is recognized by the Canadian Olympic Committee as the national team, through the IOC's recognition of the FIRS as the international organizer of inline hockey.

The 2002 FIRS Men's Inline Hockey World Championships marked Canada's return to international competition. The team won gold at the tournament.

The 2008 Men's World Inline Hockey Championships marked Canada's returned to IIHF competition. The team was led by Head Coach Gerry St Cyr and Assistant player coach Michael Hunt. Team Canada won the IIHF Division 1 World Championship in 2008

As well, Canada has participated in the inline hockey competitions at the Pan-American Games and the World Games.

== Current Rosters ==
=== 2017 IIHF World Championship roster ===
Goaltenders
#	Player	Hometown	Club
72	Brett Leggat	Hamilton, Ontario	(Canada) Brantford Blast (Allan Cup Hockey) (Tour Mudcats, Pro )
37	Paul Town	London, Ontario	(Canada) St. Mary's Lincolns (GOJHL)
Defensemen
#	Player	Hometown	Club
4	Kyle Henderson	Edmonton, Alberta	(Canada) Tour Mudcats/Devon Barons (Pro/NCHL)
5	James Isaacs	Victoria, British Columbia	(United Kingdom) Fife Flyers (UK)
7	Schael Higson	Grande Prairie, Alberta	(Canada) Brandon Wheat Kings (WHL)
22	Austin Steger	Edmonton, Alberta	(Canada) Osoyoos Coyotes (KIJHL)
47	Brendan Baumgartner	Edmonton, Alberta	(Canada) Fort Saskatchewan Chiefs (Chinook Hockey League)
89	Kade Vilio	Aldergrove, British Columbia	(Canada) Trinity Western University (BCIHL)
Forwards
#	Player	Hometown	Club
11	Joshua Foote	Sherwood Park, Alberta
20	Dave Hammond	Orange, California	Coastal Pirates Inline Hockey Club (Swakopmund, Namibia)
21	Shaun Furlong	London, Ontario	(Canada) Western Mustangs (OUA)
67	Jonah Renouf	Mississauga, Ontario	(United States) Alaska Anchorage Seawolves (NCAA)
71	Chris Raukman	Red Deer, Alberta	(Canada) Lacombe Generals (Chinook Hockey League)
76	Nathan Renouf	Mississauga, Ontario	(United States) Alaska Anchorage Seawolves (NCAA)
91	Thomas Woods	North Vancouver, British Columbia	(Netherlands) HCA Night Owls ()
92	Brett Bulmer	Prince George, British Columbia	(Germany) ERC Ingolstadt (DEL)

Coaching Staff

- Head Coach: Jason Stephens
- General Manager: Kirk Jensen
- Equipment Manager: Jarrad Davies
- Physiotherapist: Rebecca Henderson

--

=== 2012 IIHF World Championship Roster (Gold) ===
Goaltenders
#	Player	Hometown	Club
72	Brett Leggat	Hamilton, Ontario	(Canada) Brantford Blast (Allan Cup Hockey) (Tour Mudcats, Pro )
63	Ewen Macpherson	Sherwood Park, Alberta	(Canada)
Defensemen
#	Player	Hometown	Club
4	Kyle Henderson	Edmonton, Alberta	(Canada) Tour Mudcats/Devon Barons (Pro/NCHL)
9	Kirk French	Langley, British Columbia	(Canada)
55	Matthew Hutchinson	North Vancouver, British Columbia	Geneseo Ice Knights
44	Shayne Carlson	Edmonton, Alberta	(Canada)
42	Adam Ross	Red Deer, Alberta	(Canada)
22	Frédérick Corbeil	Paris, France	(Netherlands)
Forwards
#	Player	Hometown	Club
11	Joshua Foote	Sherwood Park, Alberta
20	Dave Hammond	Orange, California	Coastal Pirates Inline Hockey Club (Swakopmund, Namibia)
10	Max Grassi	North Vancouver, British Columbia	(Canada)
88	Jeff Lichimo	North Vancouver, British Columbia	(Canada)
98	Jonathan Spady	Sherwood Park, Alberta	(Canada)
91	Thomas Woods	North Vancouver, British Columbia	(Netherlands) HCA Night Owls ()

2012 Coaching Staff

- Head Coach: Jason Stephens
- General Manager: Nathan Fleck
- Equipment Manager: Jarrad Davies
- Physiotherapist: Rebecca Henderson

--

=== 2012 FIRS World Championship roster ===
Goaltenders
#	Player	Hometown	Club
31	Brad Topping	Strathroy, Ontario	()
33	Dylan Ellis	Oakville, Ontario	(United States) SUNY-Potsdam (NCAA)
Defensemen
#	Player	Hometown	Club
10	Jason Allan		()
15	Trevor Bennett		()
44	Fred Corbeil		()
Forwards
#	Player	Hometown	Club
16	Marcus Pryde	Oakville, Ontario	(France) Phénix de Reims (FFHG Division 1)
41	Phil Boudreault	Baie-Saint-Paul, Quebec	(Spain) CH Jaca (Liga Nacional de Hockey Hielo)
55	Bill Boyes	Bright's Grove, Ontario	()
59	Lukas Ciotti	Hamilton, Ontario	(United States) Adrian College (NCAA)
61	Alex Grenier		()
63	Jamie Visser	Mississauga, Ontario	(Netherlands) Friesland Flyers (North Sea Cup)
71	Max Grassi	North Vancouver, British Columbia	(Canada) UBC Thunderbirds (CIS)
91	Thomas Woods	North Vancouver, British Columbia	(United States) Tour Mudcats (NARCh)
96	Andrew Rhodes	Pickering, Ontario	(United States) Bethel University (NCAA)

Coaching Staff

- Head Coach: Richard Ropchan
- Assistant: Chad Ropchan
- Athletic Therapist: Cary Grant

== World Championship results by year ==
=== IIHF Version ===
- 1996 - Won Silver Medal
- 1997 - Won Silver Medal
- 1998 - Won Gold Medal
- 2008 - 9th Place - Division I Gold Medal
- 2009 - 7th Place - A Pool
- 2010 - 4th Place
- 2011 - Won Bronze Medal
- 2012 - Won Gold Medal
- 2013 - Won Bronze Medal
- 2014 - Won Silver Medal
- 2015 - Won Gold Medal
- 2017 - 6th Place

=== FIRS Version ===
- 1995 - Won Silver Medal
- 1997 - Won Silver Medal
- 1998 - 4th Place
- 2002 - Won Gold Medal
- 2003 - Won Bronze Medal
- 2004 - Won Silver Medal
- 2006 - Won Bronze Medal
- 2007 - Won Bronze Medal
- 2008 - 6th Place
- 2009 - Won Silver Medal
- 2010 - 6th Place
- 2011 - 4th Place
- 2012 - Won Silver Medal
