= Italy men's national inline hockey team =

Italy national inline hockey team
- League: FIHP; IIHF
- Colors: Light blue
- Head coach: Cristian Rela
- Website: FIHP

Italy men's national inline hockey team is the national team side of Italy at international inline hockey.

== Results history ==
Competition	1st place, gold medalist(s)	2nd place, silver medalist(s)	3rd place, bronze medalist(s)	Total
FIRS World Championship	0	4	3	7
IIHF World Championship	0	0	0	0
World Games	0	1	0	1
Total	0	5	3	8

== Roster 2011 ==
In the 2011 the Italian team won silver medal at the FIRS Senior Men's Inline Hockey World Championships, held in Roccaraso, Italy.

- Stefano Antinori
- Andrea Alberti
- Claudio Mantese
- Andrea Comencini
- Stefano Frigo
- Riccardo Mosele
- Enrico Dorigatti
- Matthias Eisestecken
- Luca Roffo
- Emanuele Banchero
- Ingemar Gruber
- Fabio Rigoni
- Dennis Somadossi
- Riccardo Buggin
- Luca Rigoni Luca Felicetti

== See also ==
- Italy men's national ice hockey team
- Italy men's national roller hockey team
