= Switzerland men's national inline hockey team =

Men's inline ice hockey team representing Switzerland

The following is a list of players in Switzerland's men's ice hockey team.

== Rosters ==
=== Junior Men (U20) 2016 Bronze Medal team ===
==== Goalies ====
Nr	Name	DoB	Club
1	Jan Ribak	1997	ihcSF Linth
30	Quentin Zurcher	1997	Bafabuleux Geneve

==== Defence ====
Nr	Name	DoB	Club
37 C	Mario Haldenstein	1997	IHC Wil Eagles
71 A	Jean Müller	1997	Z-Fighters Oberrüti-Sins
33	Michael Vollenweider	1997	Z-Fighters Oberrüti-Sins
41	Marcel Kuhn	1997	Z-Fighters Oberrüti-Sins
97	Joel Küttel	1997	ihcSF Linth
59	Kai Lückhof	1997	IHC Wil Eagles
29	Marco Steger	1999	Z-Fighters Oberrüti-Sins

==== Offence ====
Nr	Name	DoB	Club
87 A	Daniel Moreno	1997	Rolling Stoned Tuggen
81	Dimitri Beer	1997	Rolling Stoned Tuggen
93	Silvan Bleichenbacher	1998	IHC Wil Eagles
91	Nils Odermatt	1998	IHC Wil Eagles
53	Fabian Rickli	1997	SHC Wollerau
73	Sven Rohner	2000	ihcSF Linth
89	Flavio Lorez	1997	Z-Fighters Oberrüti-Sins

==== Staff ====
Name	Function
Michael Friedli	Head coach
