= France men's national inline hockey team =

France men's national inline hockey team is the national team for France. The team finished champion at the 2017 FIRS World Inline Hockey Championships – Senior Men's tournament.
