= 2010 IIHF InLine Hockey World Championship Division I =

International sports tournament

Tournament details
- Host country: Sweden
- Venue: 2 (in 1 host city)
- Dates: 28 June – 4 July
- Teams: 8

Tournament statistics
- Games played: 22
- Goals scored: 244 (11.09 per game)
- Scoring leader(s): (Hungary) Szilard Sandor (Croatia) Igor Jacmenjak (16 points)

The 2010 IIHF InLine Hockey World Championship Division I was the eighth IIHF InLine Hockey World Championship Division I, an annual international inline hockey tournament. It took place between 28 June and 4 July in Sweden. The games were played in the Färjestads Ishall in Karlstad, with the medal games played in the Löfbergs Lila Arena in Karlstad. Austria won the final against Croatia.

== Venues ==
Karlstad	Karlstad
Färjestads Ishall; Capacity: 4,700	Löfbergs Lila Arena; Capacity: 8,647

== Qualification ==
The following eight nations qualified for the Division I tournament. One nation from Asia, one nation from Australia, four nations from Europe, and two nations from South America were represented.

Asia

- Japan (Note: Automatic qualifier after a 2–6 placement at the 2009 IIHF InLine Hockey World Championship Division I)

Australia

- Australia

Europe

- Croatia (Note: Qualified after winning a 2010 IIHF InLine Hockey World Championship Division I Qualification)
- Great Britain
- Hungary
- Slovakia (Note: Relegated after a bottom placement at the 2009 IIHF InLine Hockey World Championship)

South America

- Argentina
- Brazil

=== Division I Qualification tournaments ===
The 2010 IIHF InLine Hockey World Championship Division I Qualification tournaments were held in July 2009. There were two qualification tournaments; an Americas qualifier and a European qualifier. The winners of each, Argentina and Croatia, advanced to the Division I tournament.

==== Americas qualifier ====
Argentina became the Americas qualifier as the only other active member, Brazil had already qualified for the 2010 tournament.

==== European qualifier ====
2009 IIHF InLine Hockey World Championship Division I European Qualification
Tournament details
- Host country: Bulgaria
- Venue: 1 (in 1 host city)
- Dates: 24 July – 26 July
- Teams: 4

The 2009 European Qualification tournament was held from July 24, 2009, to July 26, 2009. The winner of this tournament, Croatia, advanced to the next level of the IIHF World Championship, which is the Division I tournament. Games were played at the Winter Palace of Sports in Sofia, Bulgaria.

Four participating teams were placed in one group. After playing a round-robin, the top team advances to the 2010 Division I tournament.

===== Nations =====
- Bulgaria
- Croatia
- Israel
- Turkey

===== Standings =====
Team	Pld	W	OTW	OTL	L	GF	GA	GD	Pts	Qualification
Croatia	3	3	0	0	0	36	5	+31	9	Division I tournament
Bulgaria	3	2	0	0	1	24	15	+9	6	Eliminated from competition
Israel	3	1	0	0	2	12	23	−11	3	Eliminated from competition
Turkey	3	0	0	0	3	4	33	−29	0	Eliminated from competition

===== Fixtures =====
All times are local (UTC+3).

24 July; 18:00	Croatia	11 – 2	Israel	Winter Palace of Sports, Sofia

24 July; 20:00	Turkey	2 – 11	Bulgaria	Winter Palace of Sports, Sofia

25 July; 18:00	Croatia	15 – 1	Turkey	Winter Palace of Sports, Sofia

25 July; 20:00	Bulgaria	11 – 3	Israel	Winter Palace of Sports, Sofia

26 July; 14:00	Israel	7 – 1	Turkey	Winter Palace of Sports, Sofia

26 July; 18:00	Bulgaria	2 – 10	Croatia	Winter Palace of Sports, Sofia

== Seeding and groups ==
The seeding in the preliminary round was based on the final standings at the 2009 IIHF InLine Hockey World Championship, 2009 IIHF InLine Hockey World Championship Division I, and 2010 IIHF InLine Hockey World Championship Division I Qualification. The teams were grouped accordingly by seeding at the previous year's tournament (in parentheses is the corresponding seeding):

Group C

- Slovakia (9)
- Hungary (12)
- Australia (13)
- Croatia (16)

Group D

- Great Britain (10)
- Brazil (11)
- Japan (14)
- Argentina (15)

== Rosters ==
Each team's roster for the 2010 IIHF InLine Hockey World Championship Division I consisted of at least 8 skaters (forwards, and defencemen) and 2 goaltenders, and at most 16 skaters and 3 goaltenders.

== Preliminary round ==
Eight participated teams were placed in the following two groups. After playing a round-robin, the top team in each group advanced to the Qualification Games. The last three teams in each group competed in the Playoff Round.

All games were played at the Färjestads Ishall in Karlstad.

=== Group C ===
Team	Pld	W	OTW	OTL	L	GF	GA	GD	Pts	Qualification
Slovakia	3	2	0	1	0	27	11	+16	7	Qualification Games
Hungary	3	1	1	0	1	15	14	+1	5	Playoff Round
Croatia	3	1	0	0	2	14	24	−10	3	Playoff Round
Australia	3	1	0	0	2	12	19	−7	3	Playoff Round

All times are local (UTC+2).

28 June; 13:00	Hungary	2–5 (0–1, 1–2, 0–1, 1–1)	Australia	Färjestads Ishall, Karlstad; Attendance: 54

Game reference
			Referees: (United States) Kevin Lord (Slovenia) Crt Kralj
6.0 min	Penalties	4.5 min	Referees: (United States) Kevin Lord (Slovenia) Crt Kralj
35	Shots	38	Referees: (United States) Kevin Lord (Slovenia) Crt Kralj

28 June; 17:00	Croatia	2–13 (0–3, 1–5, 0–3, 1–2)	Slovakia	Färjestads Ishall, Karlstad; Attendance: 12

Game reference
			Referees: (Czech Republic) Petr Ulehla (Hungary) Miklos Incze
7.5 min	Penalties	7.5 min	Referees: (Czech Republic) Petr Ulehla (Hungary) Miklos Incze
40	Shots	42	Referees: (Czech Republic) Petr Ulehla (Hungary) Miklos Incze

29 June; 13:00	Hungary	8–5 (1–1, 4–1, 2–0, 1–3)	Croatia	Färjestads Ishall, Karlstad; Attendance: 88

Game reference
			Referees: (Austria) Ulrich Erd (Slovakia) Lubos Jakubec
6.0 min	Penalties	1.5 min	Referees: (Austria) Ulrich Erd (Slovakia) Lubos Jakubec
40	Shots	27	Referees: (Austria) Ulrich Erd (Slovakia) Lubos Jakubec

29 June; 19:00	Slovakia	10–4 (3–2, 1–2, 3–0, 3–0)	Australia	Färjestads Ishall, Karlstad; Attendance: 39

Game reference
			Referees: (Czech Republic) Radim Prchal (Sweden) Niklas Lindberg
4.5 min	Penalties	7.5 min	Referees: (Czech Republic) Radim Prchal (Sweden) Niklas Lindberg
55	Shots	35	Referees: (Czech Republic) Radim Prchal (Sweden) Niklas Lindberg

30 June; 15:00	Australia	3–7 (0–3, 2–0, 1–0, 0–4)	Croatia	Färjestads Ishall, Karlstad; Attendance: 42

Game reference
			Referees: (Sweden) Mikael Sjoqvist (Sweden) Michael Ericsson
6.0 min	Penalties	12.0 min	Referees: (Sweden) Mikael Sjoqvist (Sweden) Michael Ericsson
35	Shots	36	Referees: (Sweden) Mikael Sjoqvist (Sweden) Michael Ericsson

30 June; 19:00	Slovakia	4–5 (OT) (1–1, 1–0, 0–3, 2–0) (OT 0–1)	Hungary	Färjestads Ishall, Karlstad; Attendance: 13

Game reference
			Referees: (Finland) Jan Nordstrom (Germany) Roland Aumueller
1.5 min	Penalties	9.0 min	Referees: (Finland) Jan Nordstrom (Germany) Roland Aumueller
43	Shots	25	Referees: (Finland) Jan Nordstrom (Germany) Roland Aumueller

=== Group D ===
Team	Pld	W	OTW	OTL	L	GF	GA	GD	Pts	Qualification
Great Britain	3	3	0	0	0	23	5	+18	9	Qualification Games
Brazil	3	0	2	0	1	12	15	−3	4	Playoff Round
Japan	3	1	0	1	1	12	14	−2	4	Playoff Round
Argentina	3	0	0	1	2	11	24	−13	1	Playoff Round

All times are local (UTC+2).

28 June; 15:00	Brazil	6–5 (GWS) (0–0, 1–2, 3–1, 1–2) (OT 0–0) (SO 1–0)	Japan	Färjestads Ishall, Karlstad; Attendance: 82

Game reference
			Referees: (Sweden) Roger Ericson (Slovakia) Lubos Jakubec
3.0 min	Penalties	7.5 min	Referees: (Sweden) Roger Ericson (Slovakia) Lubos Jakubec
42	Shots	42	Referees: (Sweden) Roger Ericson (Slovakia) Lubos Jakubec

28 June; 19:00	Argentina	3–13 (1–2, 1–2, 1–6, 0–3)	Great Britain	Färjestads Ishall, Karlstad; Attendance: 50

Game reference
			Referees: (Canada) Carl Friday (Finland) Tony Kuloaro
9.0 min	Penalties	6.0 min	Referees: (Canada) Carl Friday (Finland) Tony Kuloaro
18	Shots	37	Referees: (Canada) Carl Friday (Finland) Tony Kuloaro

29 June; 15:00	Brazil	6–5 (GWS) (2–0, 0–1, 1–2, 2–2) (OT 0–0) (SO 1–0)	Argentina	Färjestads Ishall, Karlstad; Attendance: 42

Game reference
			Referees: (United States) Kevin Lord (Germany) Lars Bruggemann
3.0 min	Penalties	7.5 min	Referees: (United States) Kevin Lord (Germany) Lars Bruggemann
47	Shots	20	Referees: (United States) Kevin Lord (Germany) Lars Bruggemann

29 June; 17:00	Great Britain	5–2 (0–0, 1–0, 1–2, 3–0)	Japan	Färjestads Ishall, Karlstad; Attendance: 17

Game reference
			Referees: (Germany) Roland Aumueller (Hungary) Miklos Incze
6.0 min	Penalties	7.5 min	Referees: (Germany) Roland Aumueller (Hungary) Miklos Incze
48	Shots	22	Referees: (Germany) Roland Aumueller (Hungary) Miklos Incze

30 June; 13:00	Japan	5–3 (1–0, 3–0, 1–1, 0–2)	Argentina	Färjestads Ishall, Karlstad; Attendance: 24

Game reference
			Referees: (Australia) Jeffrey Scott (Slovenia) Crt Karlj
9.0 min	Penalties	7.5 min	Referees: (Australia) Jeffrey Scott (Slovenia) Crt Karlj
32	Shots	28	Referees: (Australia) Jeffrey Scott (Slovenia) Crt Karlj

30 June; 17:00	Great Britain	5–0 (1–0, 1–0, 2–0, 1–0)	Brazil	Färjestads Ishall, Karlstad

Game reference
			Referees: (Slovakia) Lubos Jakubec (Sweden) Niklas Lindberg
4.5 min	Penalties	4.5 min	Referees: (Slovakia) Lubos Jakubec (Sweden) Niklas Lindberg
29	Shots	26	Referees: (Slovakia) Lubos Jakubec (Sweden) Niklas Lindberg

== Playoff round ==
=== Bracket ===
Quarterfinals
C1	Austria	17
D4	Argentina	0
D2	Brazil	4
C3	Croatia	13
D1	Great Britain	1
C4	Australia	2
C2	Hungary	12
D3	Japan	4

Semifinals
#1	Austria	7
#4	Australia	2
#2	Croatia	12
#3	Hungary	8

Final
SF1	Australia	5
SF2	Hungary	6
Bronze medal game
SF1	Austria	5
SF2	Croatia	0

=== Quarter-finals ===
All times are local (UTC+2).

2 July; 13:00	Hungary	12–4 (4–0, 4–1, 2–1, 2–2)	Japan	Färjestads Ishall, Karlstad; Attendance: 35

Game reference
			Referees: (Canada) Carl Friday (Sweden) Michael Ericsson
7.5 min	Penalties	4.5 min	Referees: (Canada) Carl Friday (Sweden) Michael Ericsson
37	Shots	46	Referees: (Canada) Carl Friday (Sweden) Michael Ericsson

2 July; 15:00	Brazil	4–13 (0–3, 0–7, 2–0, 2–3)	Croatia	Färjestads Ishall, Karlstad

Game reference
			Referees: (Slovakia) Lubos Jakubec (Sweden) Niklas Lindberg
10.5 min	Penalties	7.5 min	Referees: (Slovakia) Lubos Jakubec (Sweden) Niklas Lindberg
33	Shots	48	Referees: (Slovakia) Lubos Jakubec (Sweden) Niklas Lindberg

2 July; 17:00	Great Britain	1–2 (GWS) (0–0, 1–0, 0–0, 0–1) (OT 0–0) (SO 0–1)	Australia	Färjestads Ishall, Karlstad; Attendance: 52

Game reference
			Referees: (Czech Republic) Radim Prchal (Finland) Tony Kuloaro
3.0 min	Penalties	4.5 min	Referees: (Czech Republic) Radim Prchal (Finland) Tony Kuloaro
24	Shots	25	Referees: (Czech Republic) Radim Prchal (Finland) Tony Kuloaro

2 July; 19:00	Austria	17–0 (5–0, 7–0, 2–0, 3–0)	Argentina	Färjestads Ishall, Karlstad

Game reference
			Referees: (Hungary) Miklos Incze (Sweden) Mikael Sjoqvist
4.5 min	Penalties	7.5 min	Referees: (Hungary) Miklos Incze (Sweden) Mikael Sjoqvist
39	Shots	17	Referees: (Hungary) Miklos Incze (Sweden) Mikael Sjoqvist

=== Placement ===
==== 5/6 placement ====
Time is local (UTC+2).

3 July; 13:00	Japan	8–3 (3–1, 0–1, 3–1, 2–0)	Brazil	Färjestads Ishall, Karlstad; Attendance: 28

Game reference
			Referees: (Slovakia) Lubos Jakubec (Czech Republic) Petr Ulehla
7.5 min	Penalties	12.0 min	Referees: (Slovakia) Lubos Jakubec (Czech Republic) Petr Ulehla
36	Shots	31	Referees: (Slovakia) Lubos Jakubec (Czech Republic) Petr Ulehla

==== 7/8 placement ====
Time is local (UTC+2).

3 July; 15:00	Great Britain	6–3 (2–0, 0–0, 1–1, 3–2)	Argentina	Färjestads Ishall, Karlstad; Attendance: 44

Game reference
			Referees: (Slovenia) Crt Kralj (Austria) Ulrich Erd
10.5 min	Penalties	6.0 min	Referees: (Slovenia) Crt Kralj (Austria) Ulrich Erd
31	Shots	16	Referees: (Slovenia) Crt Kralj (Austria) Ulrich Erd

=== Semi-finals ===
All times are local (UTC+2).

3 July; 17:00	Croatia	12–8 (3–2, 3–2, 4–3, 2–1)	Hungary	Färjestads Ishall, Karlstad; Attendance: 22

Game reference
			Referees: (Australia) Jeffrey Scott (Germany) Roland Aumueller
16.0 min	Penalties	6.0 min	Referees: (Australia) Jeffrey Scott (Germany) Roland Aumueller
25	Shots	41	Referees: (Australia) Jeffrey Scott (Germany) Roland Aumueller

3 July; 19:00	Austria	7–2 (3–1, 2–0, 1–0, 1–1)	Australia	Färjestads Ishall, Karlstad; Attendance: 52

Game reference
			Referees: (United States) Don Moffatt (Sweden) Michael Ericsson
1.5 min	Penalties	7.5 min	Referees: (United States) Don Moffatt (Sweden) Michael Ericsson
34	Shots	32	Referees: (United States) Don Moffatt (Sweden) Michael Ericsson

=== Third place game ===
Time is local (UTC+2).

4 July; 12:00	Australia	5–6 (1–5, 0–0, 2–0, 2–1)	Hungary	Löfbergs Lila Arena, Karlstad; Attendance: 137

Game reference
			Referees: (Austria) Ulrich Erd (United States) Kevin Lord
1.5 min	Penalties	6.5 min	Referees: (Austria) Ulrich Erd (United States) Kevin Lord
46	Shots	22	Referees: (Austria) Ulrich Erd (United States) Kevin Lord

=== Final ===
Time is local (UTC+2).

4 July; 14:00	Croatia	0–5 (0–2, 0–2, 0–0, 0–1)	Austria	Löfbergs Lila Arena, Karlstad; Attendance: 159

Game reference
			Referees: (Australia) Jeffrey Scott (Slovenia) Crt Kralj
7.5 min	Penalties	3.0 min	Referees: (Australia) Jeffrey Scott (Slovenia) Crt Kralj
16	Shots	24	Referees: (Australia) Jeffrey Scott (Slovenia) Crt Kralj

== Ranking and statistics ==
=== Standings ===
The final standings of the tournament according to IIHF:

Rk.	Team
1.	Austria
2.	Croatia
3.	Hungary
4.	Australia
5.	Great Britain
6.	Japan
7.	Brazil
8.	Argentina

=== Tournament Awards ===
- Best players selected by the directorate:
  - Best Goalkeeper: (Austria) Bernhard Starkbaum
  - Best Defenseman: (Hungary) Viktor Tokaji
  - Best Forward: (Croatia) Tomislav Grozaj

=== Scoring leaders ===
List shows the top skaters sorted by points, then goals. If the list exceeds 10 skaters because of a tie in points, all of the tied skaters are shown.

Player	GP	G	A	Pts	+/−	PIM	POS
(Hungary) Szilard Sandor	6	6	10	16	+2	10.5	FW
(Croatia) Igor Jacmenjak	6	5	11	16	+1	9.0	DF
(Croatia) Tomislav Grozaj	6	9	6	15	+3	0	FW
(Hungary) Tamas Lencses	6	7	8	15	+8	3.0	DF
(Hungary) Viktor Tokaji	6	2	10	12	+6	1.5	FW
(United Kingdom) Alex Pearman	5	7	4	11	+10	3.0	FW
(Brazil) Jose Guilardi	5	6	5	11	+5	4.5	DF
(Croatia) Mario Novak	6	6	5	11	+7	1.5	FW
(Australia) Sean Jones	6	6	4	10	+3	6.0	FW
(Hungary) Gergely Borbas	6	5	5	10	+2	0	FW
(United Kingdom) Nathan Finney	5	5	5	10	+9	0	FW
(Austria) Daniel Oberkofler*	3	3	7	10	+12	0	FW
(Croatia) Trpimir Piragic	6	3	7	10	−2	7.5	FW
(Argentina) Facundo Vadra	5	3	7	10	−4	1.5	DF

GP = Games played; G = Goals; A = Assists; Pts = Points; +/− = Plus/minus; PIM = Penalties in minutes; POS = Position
Asterisk (*) denotes that the player's team was demoted to Division I after the qualification games.

Source: IIHF.com
18:01, 4 July 2010 (UTC)

=== Leading goaltenders ===
Only the top five goaltenders, based on save percentage, who have played 40% of their team's minutes are included in this list.

Player	TOI	SA	GA	GAA	Sv%	SO
(Austria) Bernhard Starkbaum*	132:00	52	1	0.27	98.08	2
(United Kingdom) James Tanner	197:00	89	7	1.28	92.13	1
(Slovakia) Jozef Ondrejka**	96:00	75	6	2.25	92.00	0
(Japan) Mitsuhiro Oue	177:50	131	17	3.44	87.02	0
(Hungary) Krisztian Budai	189:50	147	22	4.17	85.03	0

TOI = Time On Ice (minutes:seconds); SA = Shots against; GA = Goals against; GAA = Goals against average; Sv% = Save percentage; SO = Shutouts
Asterisk (*) denotes that the player's team was demoted to Division I after the qualification games. Two asterisks (**) denote that the player's team was promoted to the Championship Division after the qualification games.

Source: IIHF.com
17:48, 4 July 2010 (UTC)

== See also ==
- 2010 IIHF InLine Hockey World Championship
- 2009 IIHF InLine Hockey World Championship Division I
- 2011 IIHF InLine Hockey World Championship Division I
