= Dick Axelsson =

Swedish ice hockey winger (born 1987)

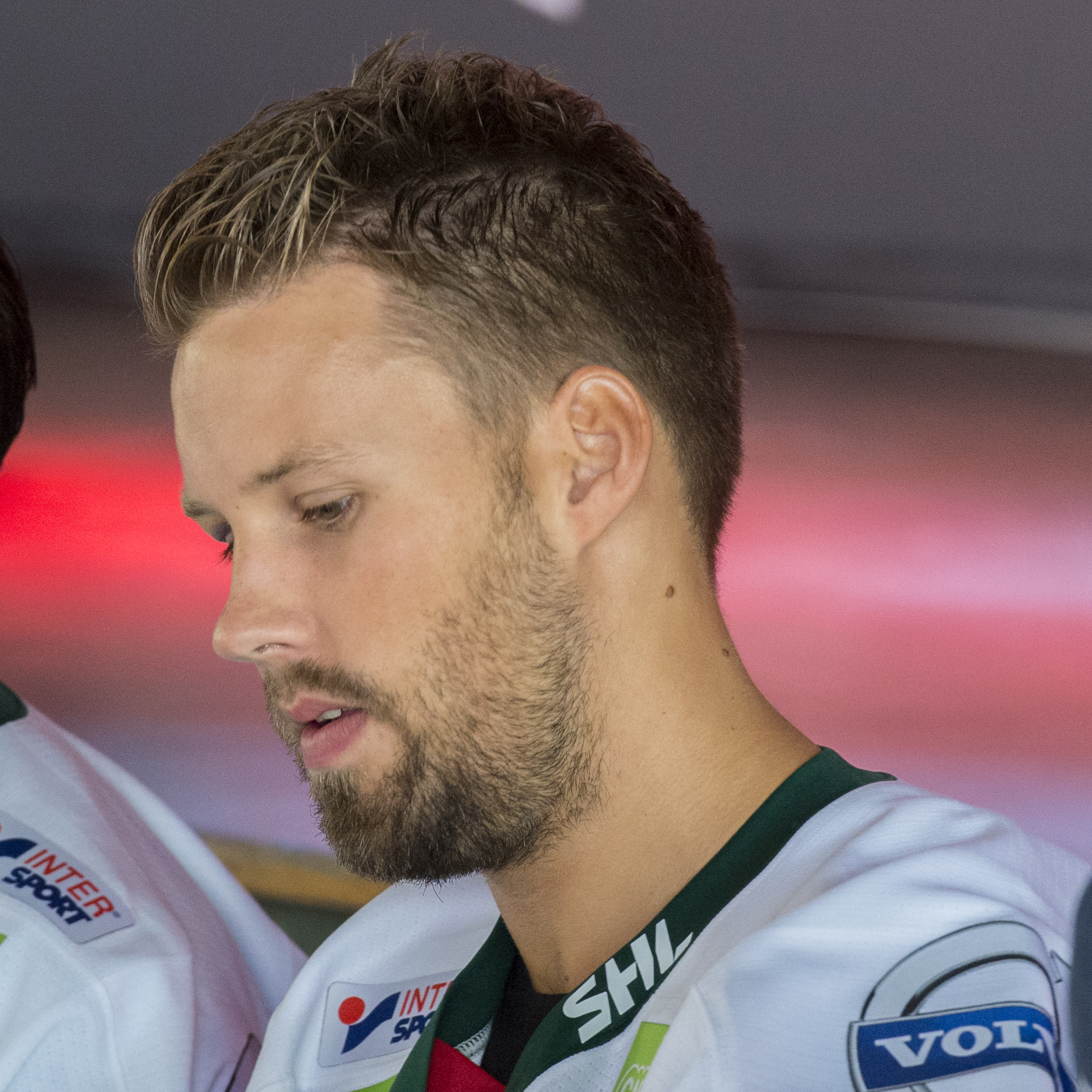
- Dick Axelsson in August 2013
- Born: 25 April 1987 (age 39) Stockholm, Sweden
- Height: 6 ft 2 in (188 cm)
- Weight: 176 lb (80 kg; 12 st 8 lb)
- Position: Left wing
- Shot: Left
- Played for: Färjestad BK; Grand Rapids Griffins; Modo Hockey; Frölunda HC; HC Davos; Djurgårdens IF
- National team: Sweden
- NHL draft: 62nd overall, 2006; Detroit Red Wings
- Playing career: 2007–2025

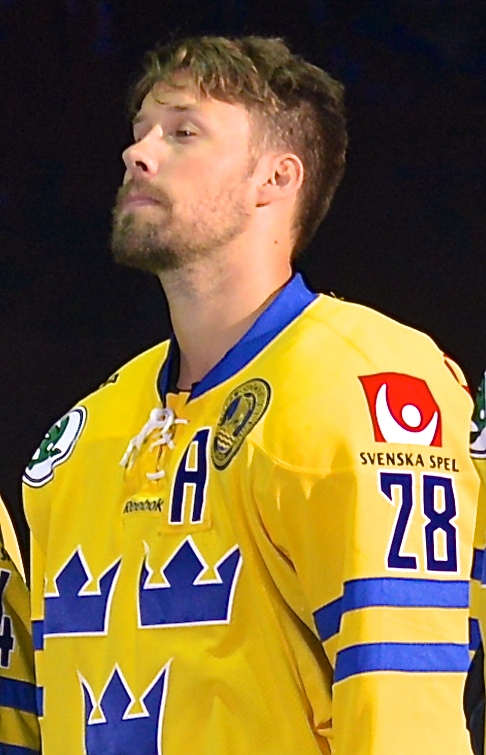

Medal record

Representing Sweden

Ice hockey

World Championships
Gold medal – first place	2013 Sweden/Finland	
Bronze medal – third place	2014 Minsk	

Dick Axelsson (born 25 April 1987) is a Swedish former professional ice hockey winger. He last played for Djurgårdens IF in Hockeyallsvenskan. He was drafted 62nd overall by the Detroit Red Wings in the 2006 NHL entry draft. Axelsson won the Swedish Championship with Färjestads in 2009, and 2011 when he also made the Elitserien All-Star team.

== Playing career ==
He was on loan with Färjestads BK of Elitserien from the Detroit Red Wings, he won the gold medal with the team in 2008–09. The Red Wings drafted him in the second round of the 2006 Draft, 62nd overall.

In 2011, Axelsson left Färjestad to join nearly relegated Modo, where he missed the first few matches due to a wrist injury. In his competitive debut, Axelsson made an assist. After one season with Modo, he then left to join his third Elitserien club, Frölunda HC, in time for the 2012–13 season.

On 31 March 2014, Axelsson opted to leave the SHL and signed a multi-year contract with Swiss club, HC Davos of the National League A (NLA). In his first season in 2014–15, Axelsson contributed to Davos capturing the Swiss championship, posting 33 points in 45 games.

Following three years in Davos, with injury plaguing the 2016–17 season, Axelsson opted to return to Swedish for a second stint with Färjestad BK on an optional two-year deal on 12 April 2017.

== Career statistics ==
=== Regular season and playoffs ===
			Regular season					Playoffs
Season	Team	League	GP	G	A	Pts	PIM	GP	G	A	Pts	PIM
2003–04	Huddinge IK	J18 Allsv	13	3	1	4	38	—	—	—	—	—
2004–05	Huddinge IK	J18 Allsv	1	0	0	0	0	—	—	—	—	—
2004–05	Huddinge IK	J20	31	12	4	16	34	3	1	0	1	0
2005–06	Huddinge IK	J20	28	19	15	34	157	—	—	—	—	—
2005–06	Huddinge IK	SWE.3	23	17	2	19	10	8	6	4	10	4
2006–07	Huddinge IK	Allsv	25	13	8	21	113	8	3	7	10	32
2007–08	Djurgårdens IF	SEL	47	12	13	25	44	5	1	0	1	2
2008–09	Djurgårdens IF	SEL	18	5	7	12	10	—	—	—	—	—
2008–09	Färjestad BK	SEL	21	6	12	18	32	9	1	3	4	2
2009–10	Grand Rapids Griffins	AHL	17	2	3	5	6	—	—	—	—	—
2009–10	Färjestad BK	SEL	15	6	4	10	24	7	1	2	3	6
2010–11	Färjestad BK	SEL	47	15	15	30	126	14	4	6	10	24
2011–12	Modo Hockey	SEL	36	9	11	20	59	6	2	1	3	18
2012–13	Frölunda HC	SEL	45	10	14	24	79	6	0	4	4	2
2013–14	Frölunda HC	SHL	48	10	25	35	56	7	1	2	3	2
2014–15	HC Davos	NLA	45	14	19	33	30	13	6	3	9	8
2015–16	HC Davos	NLA	38	10	29	39	62	9	2	5	7	18
2016–17	HC Davos	NLA	8	1	1	2	8	—	—	—	—	—
2017–18	Färjestad BK	SHL	48	21	24	45	44	6	2	0	2	4
2018–19	Djurgårdens IF	SHL	36	7	18	25	39	19	6	8	14	58
2019–20	Boo HC 2	SWE.7	3	5	7	12	2	—	—	—	—	—
2019–20	Djurgårdens IF	SHL	31	11	15	26	54	—	—	—	—	—
2020–21	Djurgårdens IF	SHL	42	9	18	27	59	3	0	3	3	4
2021–22	Brödernas Hockey	SWE.6	5	8	16	24	4	—	—	—	—	—
2021–22	Djurgårdens IF	SHL	19	5	8	13	28	—	—	—	—	—
2022–23	Brödernas Hockey	SWE.5	15	27	34	61	39	—	—	—	—	—
2022–23	Väsby IK	SWE.3	1	0	1	1	0	13	5	8	13	42
SHL totals			453	126	184	310	654	82	18	29	47	122

=== International ===
Year	Team	Event	Result	GP	G	A	Pts	PIM
2013	Sweden	WC	1st place, gold medalist(s)	8	0	3	3	4
2014	Sweden	WC	3rd place, bronze medalist(s)	10	0	1	1	0
2018	Sweden	OG	5th	4	0	0	0	2
Senior totals				22	0	4	4	6

== Inline hockey ==
Medal record

Representing Sweden

Inline hockey

World Championship
Gold medal – first place	2007 Landshut	
Gold medal – first place	2008 Bratislava	
Gold medal – first place	2009 Ingolstadt	
Bronze medal – third place	2010 Karlstad	

Axelsson found plenty of success on the inline hockey rink as a member of the Swedish national team. Axelsson was a member of five World Champion squads in 2007, 2008, 2009, 2010, and 2012.

In 2008, Axelsson dominated the competition for the duration of the tournament, registering 9 goals and 7 assists in 6 games en route to the gold medal and tournament MVP. The following year, Axelsson continued his dominance on the inline rink, tallying 8 goals and 12 assists in 6 games for the World Champions.
