= 2000–01 Djurgårdens IF (men's hockey) season =

Swedish ice hockey club season

2000-01 Djurgårdens IF
- Elitserien 2000/2001 champions
- League: 1st SHL
- 2000-01 record: 30-11-9
- Goals for: 164
- Goals against: 116

Team information
- Coach: Hardy Nilsson, Mats Waltin
- Captain: Charles Berglund
- Alternate captains: Mikael Johansson
- Arena: Globen
- Average attendance: 8,036 (2nd)

Team leaders
- Goals: (Slovakia) Vladimir Orszagh (23)
- Assists: (Sweden) Nichlas Falk (25)
- Points: (Sweden) Kristofer Ottosson (41)
- Penalty minutes: (Sweden) Mikael Magnusson (123)
- Goals against average: (Sweden) Mikael Tellqvist (2.08)

The 2000–01 Djurgårdens IF Hockey season was the season when Djurgården lost several key players to the NHL, but with new players like slovak Vladimir Orszagh from New York Islanders and Andreas Salomonsson from Modo, Djurgården defended the championship from last season. Djurgården took their 16th title.

== Playoffs ==
2000–01 Playoffs

Quarterfinals: 4–1 (Home: 2–1–0; Road: 2–0–0)
Round	Date	Opponent	Score	Goaltender	Venue	Attendance	Series	Recap
1	27/2 2001	AIK	4 – 1	Tellqvist	Globe Arena	9,218	1 – 0
2	1/3 2001	AIK	3 – 7	Tellqvist	Globe Arena	11,364	1 – 1
3	4/3 2001	AIK	5 – 3	Tellqvist	Globe Arena	13,850	2 – 1
4	6/3 2001	AIK	5 – 1	Tellqvist	Globe Arena	13,057	3 – 1
5	8/3 2001	AIK	3 – 2	Tellqvist	Globe Arena	12,844	4 – 1

Semifinals: 4–1 (Home: 3–0–0; Road: 1–1–0)
Round	Date	Opponent	Score	Goaltender	Venue	Attendance	Series	Recap
6	16/3 2001	Luleå	2 – 5	Tellqvist	Delfinens ishall	5,279	0 – 1
7	18/3 2001	Luleå	7 – 1	Tellqvist	Globe Arena	10,693	1 – 1
8	20/3 2001	Luleå	4 – 3 OT	Tellqvist	Delfinens ishall	5,547	2 – 1
9	22/3 2001	Luleå	3 – 2 OT	Tellqvist	Globe Arena	13,850	3 – 1
10	24/3 2001	Luleå	5 – 3	Tellqvist	Globe Arena	10,018	4 – 1

Finals: 4–2 (Home: 3–0–0; Road: 1–2–0)
Round	Date	Opponent	Score	Goaltender	Venue	Attendance	Series	Recap
11	31/3 2001	Färjestad	1 – 4	Tellqvist	Färjestads Ishall	4,566	0 – 1
12	2/4 2001	Färjestad	4 – 0	Tellqvist	Globe Arena	13,239	1 – 1
13	5/4 2001	Färjestad	2 – 6	Tellqvist	Färjestads Ishall	4,539	1 – 2
14	8/4 2001	Färjestad	5 – 2	Tellqvist	Globe Arena	13,850	2 – 2
15	10/4 2001	Färjestad	5 – 4 OT	Tellqvist	Globe Arena	13,850	3 – 2
16	13/4 2001	Färjestad	2 – 1 OT	Tellqvist	Färjestads Ishall	4,722	4 – 2

== Player stats ==
=== Regular season ===
==== Skaters Top-10 ====
Note: GP = Games played; G = Goals; A = Assists; Pts = Points; +/- = Plus/Minus; PIM = Penalty Minutes;

Player	GP	G	A	Pts	+/–	PIM
(Sweden) Kristofer Ottosson	46	17	24	41	+19	14
(Slovakia) Vladimir Orszagh	50	23	13	36	+17	62
(Sweden) Mikael Johansson	44	11	22	33	+12	0
(Sweden) Nichlas Falk	47	6	25	31	+11	14
(Sweden) Daniel Tjärnqvist	45	9	17	26	+21	26
(Sweden) Joakim Eriksson	49	7	17	24	+1	32
(Sweden) Andreas Salomonsson	48	10	12	22	+6	46
(Sweden) Kyösti Karjalainen	48	11	10	21	+9	28
(Canada) François Bouchard	48	10	11	21	+9	58
(Sweden) Mathias Tjärnqvist	47	11	8	19	+10	53

== Player stats ==
=== Playoffs ===
==== Skaters Top-10 ====
Note: GP = Games played; G = Goals; A = Assists; Pts = Points; +/- = Plus/Minus; PIM = Penalty Minutes;

Player	GP	G	A	Pts	+/–	PIM
(Sweden) Mikael Johansson	16	5	10	15	+16	2
(Sweden) Nichlas Falk	16	4	11	15	+5	4
(Sweden) Kyösti Karjalainen	16	6	8	14	+5	8
(Sweden) Kristofer Ottosson	14	7	4	11	+1	4
(Sweden) Daniel Tjärnqvist	16	6	5	11	+11	2
(Slovakia) Vladimir Orszagh	16	7	3	10	0	20
(Sweden) Jimmie Ölvestad	16	7	2	9	+9	14
(Sweden) Andreas Salomonsson	13	3	4	7	-6	31
(Sweden) Joakim Eriksson	15	2	5	7	+3	8
(Sweden) Charles Berglund	15	2	4	6	+3	8

stats.swehockey
