= Färjestad (disambiguation) =

Färjestad BK is a Swedish professional ice hockey club.

Färjestad or Färjestaden may also refer to:

- Färjestads Ishall, ice hockey arena in Karlstad, Sweden

== See also ==
- Färjestaden, locality in Mörbylånga Municipality, Sweden
- Färjestadens GoIF, Swedish football club
- Färjestadens IBK, now FBC Kalmarsund, Swedish floorball club
