= Löfbergs =

Swedish coffee roastery

Coordinates: 59°22′37.7″N 13°30′19.7″E

Löfbergs Lila AB
- Trade name: Löfbergs
- Company type: Private
- Industry: Coffee
- Founded: July 1906; 119 years ago
- Founder: Josef, Anders and John Löfberg
- Headquarters: Karlstad, Sweden
- Area served: Nordic countries, UK, Baltics, Canada
- Key people: Kathrine Löfberg (Chair of the Board); Fredrik Nilsson (CEO)
- Owner: Löfberg family
- Website: lofbergs.se

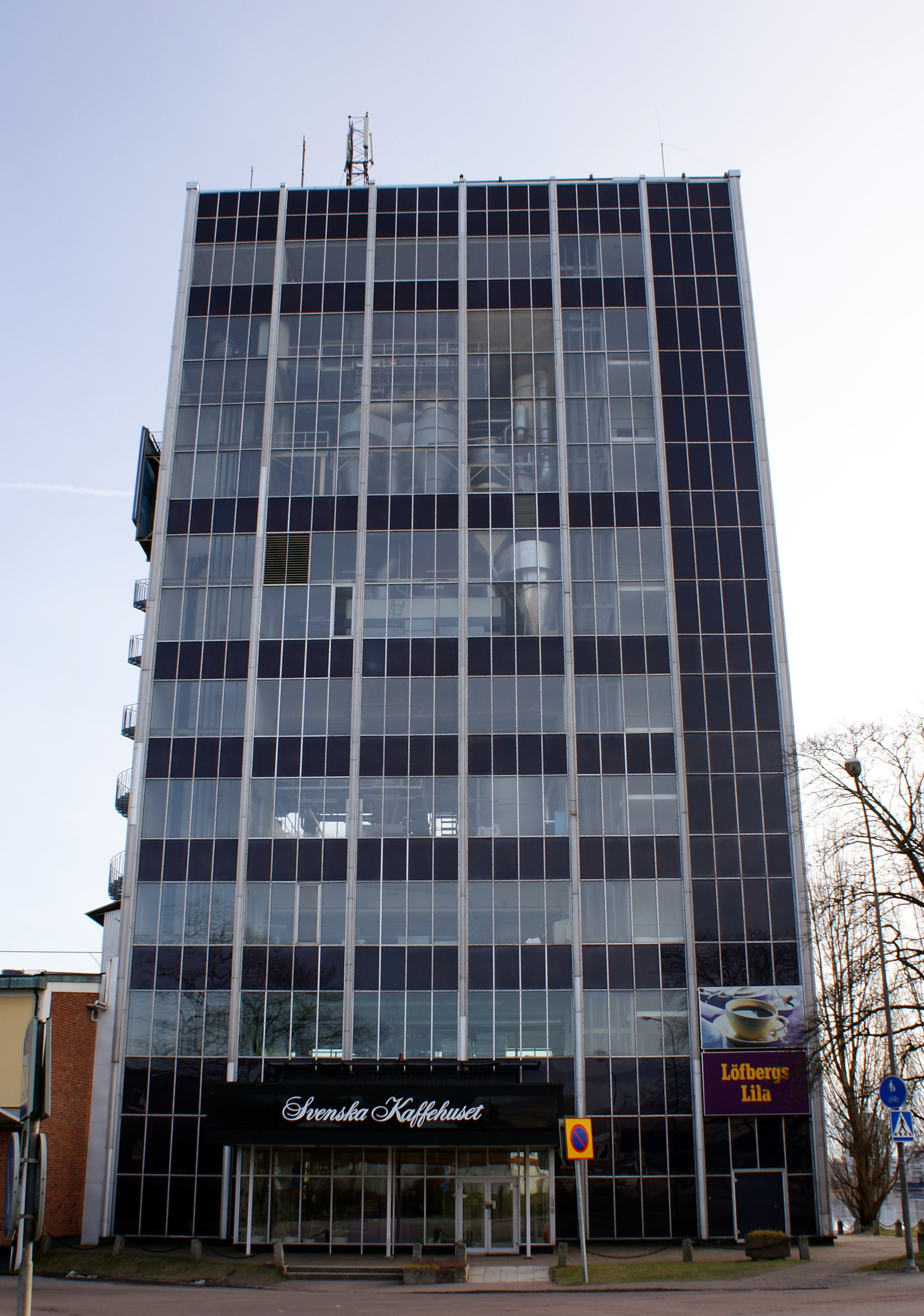
Löfbergs building

Löfbergs, officially Löfbergs Lila AB, is a coffee roastery in Karlstad, Sweden. It was founded in 1906 by the three brothers Josef, Anders and John Löfberg. Löfbergs is the second-largest coffee brand in the Swedish market, with a 24.5% market share in 2023.

Löfbergs is today one of the largest coffee roasteries in the Nordic countries. The company is still family-owned and is now in the third and fourth generation. The main office and one of the roasteries are located in Karlstad. They own 50% of Peter Larsens Kaffe in Viborg, Denmark. Löfbergs also owns Kobbs tea. The company has 200 employees. By 1999 the company had a 20% market share in Sweden.

In recent years, Löfbergs have strengthened their position in the market, with an emphasis on social responsibility and working for a better environment. Löfbergs is one of Europe's largest importers of organic and fair trade coffee, as well as being Sweden's major supplier of coffee to restaurants, cafés and companies.

Löfbergs sponsors the ice hockey team Färjestad BK as well as Löfbergs Arena. For many years, Färjestad's team colours were the same purple and yellow as Löfbergs's colours, but that was changed for the 2006–07 season. In August 2012, the roastery dropped Lila ('purple') from its brand to become Löfbergs.

Löfbergs operates a coffee bar called Löfbergs Rosteri och Kaffebar in their hometown of Karlstad. The company previously operated a café on Kungsgatan in central Stockholm, which opened in 2015; however, the location closed in January 2022.

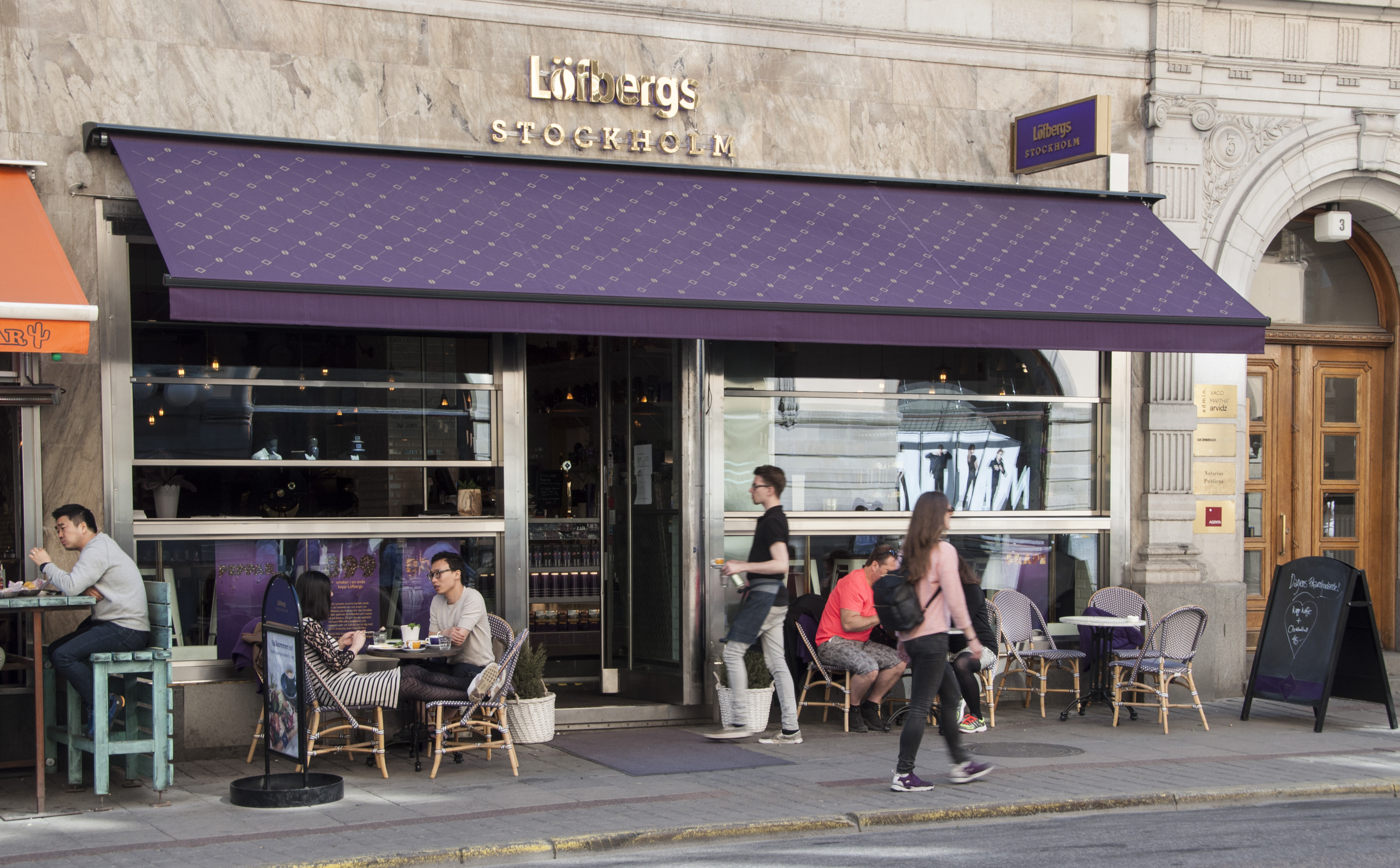
Löfbergs cafe in Stockholm, which closed in 2022
