= 2009 IIHF Inline Hockey World Championship Division I =

International sports tournament

Tournament details
- Host country: Germany
- Venues: 2 (in 1 host city)
- Dates: 7–13 June 2009
- Teams: 8

Tournament statistics
- Games played: 24
- Goals scored: 249 (10.38 per game)
- Attendance: 4,288 (179 per game)
- Scoring leader: (Austria) Martin Grabher-Meier

The 2009 IIHF Inline Hockey World Championship Division I was an international inline hockey tournament run by the International Ice Hockey Federation. The Division I tournament ran alongside the 2009 IIHF Inline Hockey World Championship and took place between 7 and 13 June 2009 in Ingolstadt, Germany at the Saturn Arena and Saturn Rink 2. The tournament was won by Austria who upon winning gained promotion to the 2010 IIHF Inline Hockey World Championship. While South Africa and Chinese Taipei were relegated to the continental qualifications after losing their relegation round games.

== Qualification ==
Three teams attempted to qualify for the two remaining spots in the 2009 IIHF Inline Hockey World Championship Division I tournament. The other six nations automatically qualified based on their results from the 2008 Championship and 2008 Division I tournaments. Chinese Taipei qualified as the Asian-Oceanian qualifier. South Africa qualified after defeating Namibia on aggregate in a best-of-two qualification series. The games were held on 24 and 30 August 2008 in Namibia and South Africa with South Africa winning the first 3–2 and tying the second 1–1.

- Australia - Finished fourth in 2008 World Championship Division I
- Austria - Relegated from the 2008 World Championship
- Brazil - Finished third in 2008 World Championship Division I
- Chinese Taipei - Asian-Oceanian qualifier
- Great Britain - Finished second in 2008 World Championship Division I
- Hungary - Finished sixth in 2008 World Championship Division I
- Japan - Finished fifth in 2008 World Championship Division I
- South Africa - Winner of Namibia/South Africa qualification series

== Seeding and groups ==
The seeding in the preliminary round was based on the final standings at the 2008 IIHF Inline Hockey World Championship and 2008 IIHF Inline Hockey World Championship Division I, and the qualification tournaments. Division I's groups are named Group C and Group D while the 2009 IIHF Inline Hockey World Championship use Group A and Group B, as both tournaments are held in Ingolstadt, Germany. The teams were grouped accordingly by seeding at the previous year's tournament (in parentheses is the corresponding seeding):

Group C

- Austria (9)
- Australia (12)
- Japan (13)
- Chinese Taipei (16)

Group D

- Great Britain (10)
- Brazil (11)
- Hungary (14)
- South Africa (15)

== Preliminary round ==
Eight participating teams were placed in the following two groups. After playing a round-robin, the top two teams advance to the Qualifying round where they face-off against the two last-placed teams of the Groups A and B from the Top Division tournament for a chance to participate in the Top Division playoffs. Teams finishing second through to fourth advance to the Playoff round.

All times are local (UTC+2).

=== Group C ===
Team	Pld	W	OTW	OTL	L	GF	GA	GD	Pts	Qualification
Austria	3	3	0	0	0	34	6	+28	9	Qualifying round
Australia	3	1	1	0	1	23	14	+9	5	Playoff round
Japan	3	1	0	1	1	13	13	0	4	Playoff round
Chinese Taipei	3	0	0	0	3	8	45	−37	0	Playoff round

7 June 2009; 13:00	Australia	5 – 4 (SO) (1–1, 1–2, 1–1, 1–0, 0–0, 1–0)	Japan	Saturn Rink 2 Attendance: 350

Game reference
9.0 min	Penalties	9.0 min
25	Shots	31

7 June 2009; 17:00	Chinese Taipei	5 – 19 (1–5, 1–6, 2–5, 1–3)	Austria	Saturn Rink 2 Attendance: 390

Game reference
1.5 min	Penalties	4.5 min
21	Shots	35

8 June 2009; 14:00	Australia	18 – 3 (3–0, 7–1, 4–2, 4–0)	Chinese Taipei	Saturn Arena; Attendance: 65

Game reference
7.5 min	Penalties	6.0 min
61	Shots	19

8 June 2009; 17:00	Austria	8 – 1 (2–1, 0–0, 4–0, 2–0)	Japan	Saturn Rink 2 Attendance: 150

Game reference
3.0 min	Penalties	6.0 min
33	Shots	18

9 June 2009; 13:00	Japan	8 – 0 (1–0, 3–0, 2–0, 2–0)	Chinese Taipei	Saturn Rink 2 Attendance: 135

Game reference
7.5 min	Penalties	9.0 min
41	Shots	18

9 June 2009; 17:00	Austria	7 – 0 (1–0, 3–0, 1–0, 2–0)	Australia	Saturn Rink 2 Attendance: 225

Game reference
6.0 min	Penalties	6.0 min
28	Shots	38

=== Group D ===
Team	Pld	W	OTW	OTL	L	GF	GA	GD	Pts	Qualification
Brazil	3	3	0	0	0	16	9	+7	9	Qualifying round
Great Britain	3	2	0	0	1	17	10	+7	6	Playoff round
Hungary	3	1	0	0	2	19	18	+1	3	Playoff round
South Africa	3	0	0	0	3	6	21	−15	0	Playoff round

7 June 2009; 15:00	Brazil	6 – 4 (2–0, 1–1, 0–3, 3–0)	Hungary	Saturn Rink 2 Attendance: 400

Game reference
3.0 min	Penalties	6.0 min
37	Shots	17

7 June 2009; 19:00	South Africa	1 – 5 (0–3, 0–0, 1–1, 0–1)	Great Britain	Saturn Rink 2 Attendance: 63

Game reference
3.0 min	Penalties	4.5 min
18	Shots	25

8 June 2009; 15:00	Brazil	5 – 3 (3–1, 1–1, 1–1, 0–0)	South Africa	Saturn Rink 2 Attendance: 102

Game reference
4.5 min	Penalties	9.0 min
32	Shots	28

8 June 2009; 19:00	Great Britain	10 – 4 (2–1, 3–0, 1–3, 4–0)	Hungary	Saturn Rink 2 Attendance: 123

Game reference
6.0 min	Penalties	13.5 min
44	Shots	17

9 June 2009; 15:00	Hungary	11 – 2 (4–1, 2–0, 2–1, 3–0)	South Africa	Saturn Rink 2 Attendance: 85

Game reference
10.5 min	Penalties	12.0 min
49	Shots	17

9 June 2009; 19:00	Great Britain	2 – 5 (0–0, 0–1, 1–0, 1–4)	Brazil	Saturn Rink 2

Game reference
6.0 min	Penalties	3.0 min
18	Shots	30

== Qualifying round ==
Austria and Brazil advanced to the qualifying round after finishing first in Group C and Group D respectively. Austria faced off against Canada, who finished last in Group A of the Top Division tournament, and Brazil was drawn against Slovakia, who finished last in Group B of the Top Division tournament, for a chance to participate in the Top Division playoffs. Both Austria and Brazil lost their matches and advanced to the Division I playoffs, while Canada and Slovakia advanced to the Top Division playoffs.

All times are local (UTC+2).

10 June 2009; 16:00	Canada	4 – 3 (3–0, 0–1, 1–1, 0–1)	Austria	Saturn Arena; Attendance: 238

Game reference
3.0 min	Penalties	7.5 min
47	Shots	19

10 June 2009; 18:00	Slovakia	6 – 3 (1–0, 2–1, 1–1, 2–1)	Brazil	Saturn Arena; Attendance: 265

Game reference
17.5 min	Penalties	7.5 min
27	Shots	24

== Playoff round ==
Austria and Brazil advanced to the playoff round after losing their qualifying round matches. They were seeded alongside the six other teams of the tournament based on their results in the preliminary round. The four winning quarterfinalists advanced to the semifinals while the losing teams moved on to the relegation round. In the relegation round Chinese Taipei and South Africa lost their games to Australia and Japan respectively and were relegated to the continental qualifications. In the semifinals Great Britain defeated Brazil and Austria beat Hungary, both advancing to the final. After losing the semifinals Brazil and Hungary played off for the bronze medal with Brazil winning 4–3. Austria defeated Great Britain 2–1 in the final and earned promotion to the 2010 IIHF Inline Hockey World Championship.

Quarterfinals
D1	Brazil	10
C4	Chinese Taipei	0
D2	Great Britain	5
C3	Japan	2
C1	Austria	8
D4	South Africa	2
C2	Australia	4
D3	Hungary	5

Semifinals
QF1	Brazil	3
QF2	Great Britain	5
QF3	Austria	9
QF4	Hungary	1

Finals
SF1	Great Britain	1
SF2	Austria	2
Bronze medal game
SF1	Brazil	4
SF2	Hungary	3

All times are local (UTC+2).

=== Quarterfinals ===
11 June 2009; 13:00	Australia	4 – 5 (0–0, 1–0, 1–2, 2–3)	Hungary	Saturn Rink 2 Attendance: 189

Game reference
7.5 min	Penalties	9.0 min
36	Shots	24

11 June 2009; 15:00	Great Britain	5 – 2 (0–0, 2–0, 0–1, 3–1)	Japan	Saturn Rink 2 Attendance: 193

Game reference
24.5 min	Penalties	3.0 min
30	Shots	21

11 June 2009; 17:00	Austria	8 – 2 (2–0, 4–0, 0–2, 2–0)	South Africa	Saturn Rink 2 Attendance: 211

Game reference
4.5 min	Penalties	4.5 min
28	Shots	14

11 June 2009; 19:00	Brazil	10 – 0 (0–0, 5–0, 4–0, 1–0)	Chinese Taipei	Saturn Rink 2 Attendance: 123

Game reference

=== Relegation round ===
12 June 2009; 13:00	Japan	9 – 2 (3–1, 3–0, 3–0, 0–1)	South Africa	Saturn Rink 2 Attendance: 65

Game reference
9.0 min	Penalties	9.0 min
27	Shots	29

12 June 2009; 15:00	Australia	15 – 7 (5–1, 4–0, 3–1, 3–5)	Chinese Taipei	Saturn Rink 2

Game reference
6.0 min	Penalties	3.0 min
38	Shots	26

=== Semifinals ===
12 June 2009; 17:00	Brazil	3 – 5 (0–1, 0–2, 2–1, 1–1)	Great Britain	Saturn Rink 2 Attendance: 175

Game reference
4.5 min	Penalties	9.0 min
40	Shots	18

12 June 2009; 19:00	Austria	9 – 1 (4–0, 2–0, 2–0, 1–1)	Hungary	Saturn Rink 2 Attendance: 123

Game reference
0.0 min	Penalties	22.0 min
36	Shots	14

=== Third place game ===
13 June 2009; 12:00	Brazil	4 – 3 (0–2, 2–0, 1–1, 1–0)	Hungary	Saturn Arena; Attendance: 118

Game reference
3.0 min	Penalties	1.5 min
47	Shots	34

=== Final ===
13 June 2009; 14:00	Austria	2 – 1 (0–0, 2–0, 0–0, 0–1)	Great Britain	Saturn Arena; Attendance: 500

Game reference
7.5 min	Penalties	4.5 min
22	Shots	21

== Ranking and statistics ==
=== Standings ===
The final standings of the tournament according to IIHF:

Rk.	Team
1.	Austria
2.	Great Britain
3.	Brazil
4.	Hungary
5.	Australia
6.	Japan
7.	Chinese Taipei
8.	South Africa

=== Scoring leaders ===
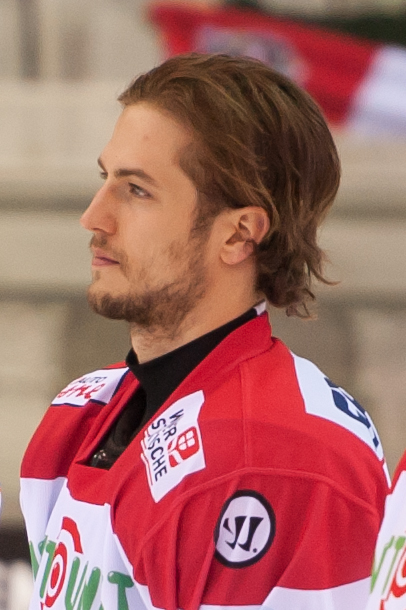
Austria's Raphael Herburger scored six goals and eight assists in his six games

List shows the top skaters sorted by points, then goals. If the list exceeds 10 skaters because of a tie in points, all of the tied skaters are shown. Games from the qualifying round do not count towards the Division I statistics.

Player	GP	G	A	Pts	+/-	PIM	POS
(Austria) Martin Grabher-Meier	6	7	11	18	+17	1.5	F
(Austria) Harry Lange	6	5	12	17	+15	0.0	F
(Australia) Peter Matus	5	5	10	15	+11	6.0	F
(Austria) Raphael Herburger	6	6	8	14	+13	1.5	F
(Austria) Mario Altmann	6	6	7	13	+11	1.5	D
(Austria) Alexander Feichtner	6	8	4	12	+11	1.5	F
(Australia) Sean Jones	5	7	5	12	+10	1.5	F
(Hungary) Szilard Sandor	6	4	8	12	+9	6.0	F
(Brazil) Diego Araujo	6	3	9	12	+9	1.5	D
(Austria) Mark Brunnegger	6	8	3	11	+10	3.0	D
(United Kingdom) Philip Hamer	6	7	4	11	+10	6.0	F
(Hungary) Gergely Borbas	6	4	7	11	+8	4.5	F
(Austria) Christian Dolezal	5	3	8	11	+10	3.0	F
(Austria) Youssef Riener	6	1	10	11	+10	0.0	D

=== Leading goaltenders ===
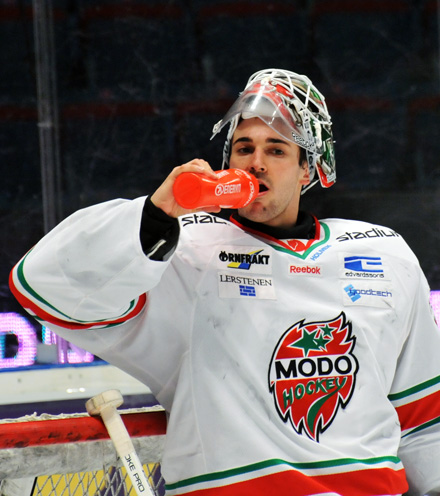
Bernhard Starkbaum of Austria finished as the leading goaltender with a save percentage of 96.70

Only the top five goaltenders, based on save percentage, who have played at least 40% of their team's minutes are included in this list. Games from the qualifying round do not count towards the Division I statistics.

Player	MIP	SOG	GA	GAA	SVS%	SO
(Austria) Bernhard Starkbaum	192:00	91	3	0.56	96.70	1
(United Kingdom) James Tanner	216:00	117	12	2.00	89.74	0
(Japan) Shingo Imagawa	161:00	89	11	2.46	87.64	0
(Brazil) Thiago Arauja	216:00	93	14	2.33	84.95	0
(Hungary) Attila Szoke	199:50	153	24	4.32	84.31	0
