= 2009 IIHF Inline Hockey World Championship =

International sports tournament

Tournament details
- Host country: Germany
- Venue(s): Saturn Arena, Ingolstadt
- Dates: 6–13 June 2009
- Teams: 8

Final positions
- Champions: Sweden (5th title)
- Runners-up: United States
- Third place: Germany
- Fourth place: Finland

Tournament statistics
- Games played: 24
- Goals scored: 258 (10.75 per game)
- Attendance: 26,485 (1,104 per game)
- Scoring leader(s): (Sweden) Dick Axelsson (20 pts)

The 2009 IIHF Inline Hockey World Championship was the 13th IIHF Inline Hockey World Championship, an international inline hockey tournament run by the International Ice Hockey Federation. The World Championship runs alongside the 2009 IIHF Inline Hockey World Championship Division I tournament and took place between 6 and 13 June 2009 in Ingolstadt, Germany and the Saturn Arena. The tournament was won by Sweden, earning their third straight World Championship title and fifth overall. The United States finished in second place and Germany in third after defeating Finland in the bronze medal match. Slovakia, after losing the seventh/eighth game against Canada was relegated to Division I for 2010.

== Venue ==
Ingolstadt
Saturn Arena
Capacity: 4,815
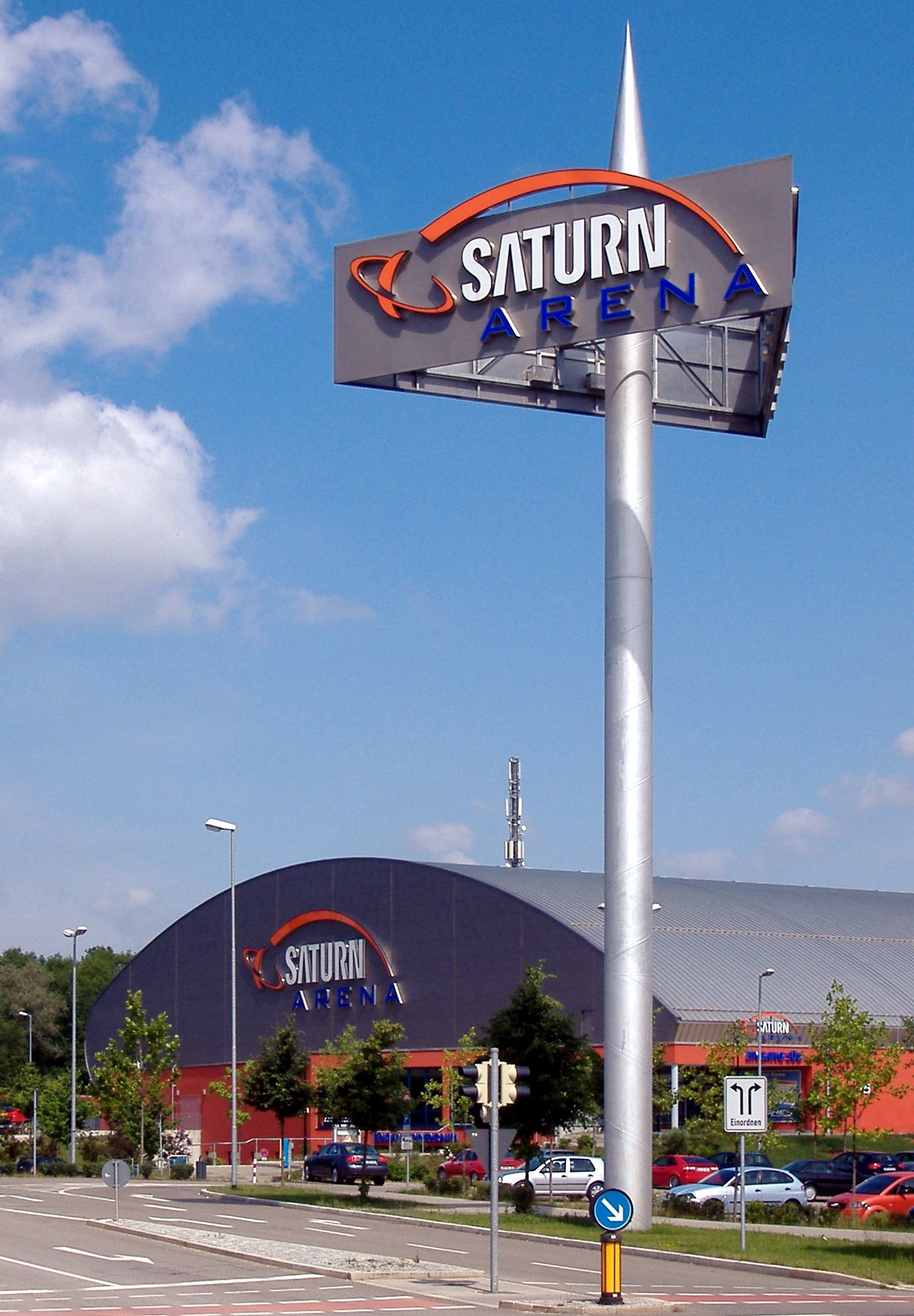

== Qualification ==
Seven of the eight teams automatically qualified for the 2009 IIHF Inline Hockey World Championship while the eighth spot was awarded to the winner of the 2008 IIHF Inline Hockey World Championship Division I tournament. Six nations from Europe, and two nations from North America were represented. The 2008 Division I tournament was won by Canada who defeated Great Britain to earn promotion to the World Championship.

- Canada − Winner of 2008 IIHF Inline Hockey World Championship Division I
- Czech Republic − Finished fifth in the 2008 World Championship
- Finland − Finished sixth in the 2008 World Championship
- Germany − Finished third in the 2008 World Championship
- Slovakia − Finished second in the 2008 World Championship
- Slovenia − Finished seventh in the 2008 World Championship
- Sweden − Finished first in the 2008 World Championship
- United States − Finished fourth in the 2008 World Championship

== Seeding and groups ==
The seeding in the preliminary round was based on the final standings at the 2008 IIHF Inline Hockey World Championship and 2008 IIHF Inline Hockey World Championship Division I tournaments. The World Championship groups are named Group A and Group B while the 2009 IIHF Inline Hockey World Championship Division I tournament uses Group C and Group D, as both tournaments were held in Ingolstadt, Germany. The teams were grouped accordingly by seeding at the previous year's tournament (in parentheses is the corresponding seeding):

Group A

- Sweden (1)
- United States (4)
- Czech Republic (5)
- Canada (8)

Group B

- Slovakia (2)
- Germany (3)
- Finland (6)
- Slovenia (7)

== Preliminary round ==
Eight participating teams were placed in the following two groups. After playing a round-robin, the top three teams in each group advance to the playoff round. The last team in each group compete in the qualifying round where they face-off against the top ranked teams of Group C and Group D from the Division I tournament for a chance to participate in the Top Division playoffs.

All times are local (UTC+2).

=== Group A ===
Team	Pld	W	OTW	OTL	L	GF	GA	GD	Pts	Qualification
United States	3	1	1	1	0	19	16	+3	6	Playoff round
Sweden	3	1	1	0	1	21	19	+2	5	Playoff round
Czech Republic	3	1	0	1	1	17	18	−1	4	Playoff round
Canada	3	1	0	0	2	12	16	−4	3	Qualifying round

7 June; 14:00	United States	6 – 5 GWS (2–3, 1–0, 1–0, 1–2) (OT: 0–0) (SO: 1–0)	Czech Republic	Saturn Arena, Ingolstadt; Attendance: 843

T. Tartaglione (24 saves / 29 shots)
Goalies
O. Jirkuv (22 saves / 28 shots)
Referees:
(Canada) Kendall Waiting
(Sweden) Sjoqvist

W. Sweatt 1 (R. Rodriguez) - 02:07	1 – 0
	1 – 1	02:28 - L. Broz 1 (J. Kubista)
C. Yoder 1 (J. Beilsten) - 03:29	2 – 1
	2 – 2	05:04 - pp - L. Broz 2 (T. Demel, P. Beranek)
	2 – 3	07:16 - pp - P. Tenkrat 1 (L. Broz, P. Strycek)
B. Yingling 1 (C. Yoder) - 19:07	3 – 3
W. Sweatt 2 (I. Chavira, N. Sigmund) - 33:18	4 – 3
	4 – 4	39:06 - P. Tenkrat 2 (L. Vlcek, J. Besser)
	4 – 5	40:34 - M. Vozdecky 1 (L. Vlcek)
C. Yoder 2 (P. Lee, B. Yingling) - pp - 45:07	5 – 5
G. Osterkamp 1 - gws - 53:00	6 – 5

6.0 min
Penalties
7.5 min
28
Shots
29

7 June; 18:00	Canada	4 – 6 (2–0, 2–3, 0–1, 0–2)	Sweden	Saturn Arena, Ingolstadt; Attendance: 751

K. St. Pierre (46 saves / 52 shots)
Goalies
P. Sjogren (17 saves / 21 shots)
Referees:
(Australia) Jeffrey Scott
(Germany) Mark Ansorg

A. Ross 1 (D. Hammond) - 07:19	1 – 0
K. French 1 (A. Ross, B. Brooks) - 10:17	2 – 0
T. Woods 1 - 15:20	3 – 0
M. Drury 1 (D. Hammond, G. Smith) - 15:40	4 – 0
	4 – 1	18:34 - pp - H. Hoglund 1 (A. Svensson, D. Wessner)
	4 – 2	19:02 - M. Kuukkonen 1 (D. Brolin, K. Luukkonen)
	4 – 3	19:30 - D. Axelsson 1 (A. Svensson, L. Klasen)
	4 – 4	32:36 - M. Luukkonen 2 (D. Brolin)
	4 – 5	40:24 - D. Axelsson 2 (D. Wessner, M. Thelander)
	4 – 6	44:23 - pp - H. Hoglund 2 (D. Wessner, D. Axelsson)

18.0 min
Penalties
3.0 min
21
Shots
52

8 June; 16:00	United States	7 – 4 (2–1, 2–0, 0–0, 3–3)	Canada	Saturn Arena, Ingolstadt; Attendance: 250

T. Redmann (23 saves / 27 shots)
Goalies
K. St. Pierre (33 saves / 40 shots)
Referees:
(Sweden) Niklas Lindberg
(Finland) Jan Nordstrom

J. Beilsten 1 (N. Sigmund) - 00:45	1 – 0
E. Hartlieb 1 (S. Gawrys) - 05:15	2 – 0
	2 – 1	05:51 - pp - D. Hammond 1 (B. Brooks)
N. Sigmund 1 (I. Chavira) - 14:00	3 – 1
J. Beilsten 2 (P. Lee, B. Yingling) - pp - 19:23	4 – 1
	4 – 2	36:39 - A. Ross 2 (B. Brooks)
C. Yoder 3 (G. Osterkamp, J. Beilsten) - 37:20	5 – 2
	5 – 3	41:01 - pp - P. Patterson 1 (M. Vevang)
W. Sweatt 3 (I. Chavira) - 43:31	6 – 3
	6 – 4	44:35 - D. Hammond 2 (M. Vevang, B. Finerty)
B. Yingling 2 (J. Beilsten) - 44:44	7 – 4

7.5 min
Penalties
9.0 min
40
Shots
27

8 June; 18:00	Sweden	8 – 9 (2–2, 3–1, 2–4, 1–2)	Czech Republic	Saturn Arena, Ingolstadt; Attendance: 350

P. Sjogren (out 36:00) (19 saves / 26 shots)
D. Karlsson (in 36:00) (6 saves / 8 shots)
Goalies
P. Pavlicek (out 32:40) (21 saves / 20 shots)
O. Jirkuv (in 32:40) (8 saves / 8 shots)
Referees:
(United States) Terry Farrar
(Slovenia) Crt Kralj

J. Bergman 1 (S. Olsson, J. Andersson) - 01:46	1 – 0
	1 – 1	06:42 - M. Vozdecky 2 (P. Strycek, L. Broz)
S. Olsson 1 (L. Klasen) - 09:08	2 – 1
	2 – 2	11:52 - J. Polansky 1 (P. Sebek)
D. Wessner 1 (D. Axelsson) - 14:22	3 – 2
D. Wessner 2 (D. Axelsson, M. Thelander) - 17:12	4 – 2
K. Luukkonen 1 (J. Karlsson, M. Luukkonen) - 20:28	5 – 2
	5 – 3	21:00 - P. Tenkrat 3
D. Wessner 3 (D. Axelsson, J. Andersson) - pp - 24:17	6 – 3
	6 – 4	36:45 - pp - J Polansky 2 (L. Vlcek)
	6 – 5	27:36 - J. Bessner 1 (P. Sebek)
L. Klasen 1 (S. Olsson) - 32:20	7 – 5
	7 – 6	35:40 - J. Polansky 3 (L. Broz)
	7 – 7	35:59 - L. Broz 3 (M. Vozdecky, P. Strycek)
	7 – 8	37:31 - T. Demel 1 (M. Vozdecky, J. Kubista)
H. Hoglund 3 - 39:17	8 – 8
	8 – 9	47:17 - pp - P. Tenkrat 4 (M. Vozdecky)

20.5 min
Penalties
12.0 min
28
Shots
34

9 June; 14:00	Czech Republic	3 – 4 (2–1, 0–1, 1–1, 0–1)	Canada	Saturn Arena, Ingolstadt; Attendance: 270

O. Jirkuv (24 saves / 28 shots)
Goalies
C. Wills (19 saves / 22 shots)
Referees:
(Hungary) Miklos Incze
(United States) Brad Sotak

L. Broz 4 (J. Polansky) - 03:02	1 – 0
	1 – 1	03:47 - D. Hammond 3 (B. Brooks)
J. Kubista 1 (P. Tenkrat, P. Strycek) - 04:30	2 – 1
	2 – 2	18:10 - B. Brooks 1 (K. French)
	2 – 3	25:37 - M. Drury 2 (P. Patterson)
J. Polansky 4 (T. Demel) - 29:20	3 – 3
	3 – 4	45:50 - B. Brooks 2 (K. French, D. Hammond)

3.0 min
Penalties
7.5 min
22
Shots
28

9 June; 18:00	Sweden	7 – 6 GWS (0–2, 2–1, 2–1, 2–2) (OT: 0–0) (SO: 1–0)	United States	Saturn Arena, Ingolstadt; Attendance: 890

D. Karlsson (28 saves / 34 shots)
Goalies
T. Redmann (33 saves / 40 shots)
Referees:
(Austria) Ulrich Erd
(Czech Republic) Radim Prchal

	0 – 1	00:41 - K. Gouge 1 (S. Oleksy, P. Lee)
	0 – 2	01:29 - G. Osterkamp 2
	0 – 3	15:34 - N. Sigmund 2
J. Andersson 1 (D. Axelsson, D. Wessner) - 20:06	1 – 3
D. Wessner 4 (D. Brolin, D. Axelsson) - pp - 21:40	2 – 3
L. Klasen 2 (K. Luukkonen, A. Svensson) - pp - 25:15	3 – 3
L. Klasen 3 (A. Svensson, H. Hoglund) - pp - 34:44	4 – 3
	4 – 4	35:34 - pp - E. Hartlieb 2 (P. Lee, S. Gawrys)
	4 – 5	36:11 - pp - B. Yingling 3 (C. Yoder, J. Beilsten)
A. Svensson 1 (L. Klasen) - pp - 38:29	5 – 5
D. Wessner 5 (D. Axelsson, D. Brolin) - pp - 39:50	6 – 5
	6 – 6	47:48 - J. Beilsten 3
K. Luukonen 2 - gws - 53:00	7 – 6

14.5 min
Penalties
10.5 min
40
Shots
34

=== Group B ===
Team	Pld	W	OTW	OTL	L	GF	GA	GD	Pts	Qualification
Germany	3	3	0	0	0	27	10	+17	9	Playoff round
Finland	3	2	0	0	1	10	10	0	6	Playoff round
Slovenia	3	0	1	0	2	16	18	−2	2	Playoff round
Slovakia	3	0	0	1	2	11	26	−15	1	Qualifying round

6 June; 19:00	Germany	7 – 5 (3–1, 0–1, 3–2, 1–1)	Slovenia	Saturn Arena, Ingolstadt; Attendance: 2,500

			Referees: (Czech Republic) Radim Prchal (Sweden) Sjoqvist
6.0 min	Penalties	7.5 min	Referees: (Czech Republic) Radim Prchal (Sweden) Sjoqvist
53	Shots	24	Referees: (Czech Republic) Radim Prchal (Sweden) Sjoqvist

7 June; 16:00	Slovenia	8 – 7 OT (2–0, 2–1, 1–2, 2–4) (OT: 1–0)	Slovakia	Saturn Arena, Ingolstadt; Attendance: 861

			Referees: (Austria) Jeffrey Scott (Germany) Josiph Singer
9.0 min	Penalties	10.5 min	Referees: (Austria) Jeffrey Scott (Germany) Josiph Singer
34	Shots	37	Referees: (Austria) Jeffrey Scott (Germany) Josiph Singer

7 June; 20:00	Germany	7 – 1 (1–1, 2–0, 1–0, 3–0)	Finland	Saturn Arena, Ingolstadt; Attendance: 2,600

			Referees: (United States) Brad Sotak (United States) Terry Farrar
6.0 min	Penalties	3.0 min	Referees: (United States) Brad Sotak (United States) Terry Farrar
33	Shots	37	Referees: (United States) Brad Sotak (United States) Terry Farrar

8 June; 18:00	Slovakia	0 – 5 (0–3, 0–1, 0–1, 0–0)	Finland	Saturn Arena, Ingolstadt; Attendance: 250

			Referees: (Germany) Marcus Trottmann (Canada) Kendall Waiting
22.5 min	Penalties	10.0 min	Referees: (Germany) Marcus Trottmann (Canada) Kendall Waiting
24	Shots	53	Referees: (Germany) Marcus Trottmann (Canada) Kendall Waiting

9 June; 16:00	Finland	4 – 3 (2–0, 2–0, 0–2, 0–1)	Slovenia	Saturn Arena, Ingolstadt; Attendance: 204

			Referees: (Germany) Michael Low (Slovakia) Norbert Druga
7.5 min	Penalties	9.0 min	Referees: (Germany) Michael Low (Slovakia) Norbert Druga
23	Shots	20	Referees: (Germany) Michael Low (Slovakia) Norbert Druga

9 June; 20:00	Slovakia	4 – 13 (0–2, 3–3, 1–3, 0–5)	Germany	Saturn Arena, Ingolstadt; Attendance: 2,400

			Referees: (Sweden) Niklas Lindberg (Australia) Jeffrey Scott
9.0 min	Penalties	1.5 min	Referees: (Sweden) Niklas Lindberg (Australia) Jeffrey Scott
30	Shots	41	Referees: (Sweden) Niklas Lindberg (Australia) Jeffrey Scott

== Qualifying round ==
Canada and Slovakia advanced to the qualifying round after finishing last in Group A and Group B respectively. Canada faced off against Austria, who finished first in Group C of the Division I tournament, and Slovakia was drawn against Brazil, who finished first in Group D of the Division I tournament, for a chance to participate in the Top Division playoffs. Both Canada and Slovakia won their matches and advanced to the Top Division playoffs, while Austria and Brazil advanced to the Division I playoffs.

All times are local (UTC+2).

10 June 2009; 16:00	Canada	4 – 3 (3–0, 0–1, 1–1, 0–1)	Austria	Saturn Arena; Attendance: 238

Game reference
3.0 min	Penalties	7.5 min
47	Shots	19

10 June 2009; 18:00	Slovakia	6 – 3 (1–0, 2–1, 1–1, 2–1)	Brazil	Saturn Arena; Attendance: 265

Game reference
17.5 min	Penalties	7.5 min
27	Shots	24

== Playoff round ==
Canada and Slovakia advanced to the playoff round after winning their qualifying round matches. They were seeded alongside the six other teams of the tournament based on their results in the preliminary round. The four winning quarterfinalists advanced to the semifinals while the losing teams moved on to the placement round. Slovakia was relegated to Division I after losing the seventh/8th game against Canada, while Slovenia finished fifth after defeating the Czech Republic in the fifth/6th game. In the semifinals the United States defeated Finland and Sweden beat Germany, both advancing to the gold medal game. After losing the semifinals Finland and Germany played off for the bronze medal with Germany winning 9–5. Sweden defeated the United States 7–6 in the gold medal game, earning their third straight World Championship title and fifth overall.

=== Draw ===
Quarterfinals
A1	United States	6
B4	Slovakia	2
B2	Finland	4
A3	Czech Republic	3
B1	Germany	8
A4	Canada	3
A2	Sweden	8
B3	Slovenia	3

Semifinals
QF2	United States	8
QF3	Finland	4
QF4	Germany	6
QF1	Sweden	8

Finals
SF1	United States	6
SF2	Sweden	7
Bronze medal game
SF1	Finland	5
SF2	Germany	9

All times are local (UTC+2).

=== Quarter-finals ===
11 June; 14:00	Sweden	8 – 3 (1–1, 2–0, 3–1, 2–1)	Slovenia	Saturn Arena, Ingolstadt; Attendance: 463

12.0 min	Penalties	16.5 min
38	Shots	25

11 June; 16:00	United States	6 – 2 (1–2, 0–0, 3–0, 2–0)	Slovakia	Saturn Arena, Ingolstadt; Attendance: 855

1.5 min	Penalties	4.5 min
38	Shots	17

11 June; 14:00	Finland	4 – 3 OT (0–1, 0–1, 2–0, 1–1) (OT: 1–0)	Czech Republic	Saturn Arena, Ingolstadt; Attendance: 1,830

			Referees: (United States) Terry Farrar (Germany) Maik Ansorg
13.5 min	Penalties	10.5 min	Referees: (United States) Terry Farrar (Germany) Maik Ansorg
19	Shots	38	Referees: (United States) Terry Farrar (Germany) Maik Ansorg

11 June; 20:00	Germany	8 – 3 (2–0, 1–0, 4–1, 1–2)	Canada	Saturn Arena, Ingolstadt; Attendance: 3,600

			Referees: (Sweden) Sjoqvist (Finland) Jan Nordstrom
4.5 min	Penalties	17.5 min	Referees: (Sweden) Sjoqvist (Finland) Jan Nordstrom
43	Shots	22	Referees: (Sweden) Sjoqvist (Finland) Jan Nordstrom

=== Placement round ===
==== 5th/6th game ====
12 June; 14:00	Slovenia	6 – 4 (1–1, 1–1, 1–2, 3–0)	Czech Republic	Saturn Arena, Ingolstadt; Attendance: 183

			Referees: (Austria) Ulrich Erd (Germany) Mark Ansorg
7.5 min	Penalties	15.0 min	Referees: (Austria) Ulrich Erd (Germany) Mark Ansorg
31	Shots	20	Referees: (Austria) Ulrich Erd (Germany) Mark Ansorg

==== 7th/8th game ====
12 June; 16:00	Slovakia	1 – 8 (1–1, 0–4, 0–1, 0–2)	Canada	Saturn Arena, Ingolstadt; Attendance: 380

			Referees: (United States) Brad Sotak (Finland) Jan Nordstrom
9.0 min	Penalties	6.0 min	Referees: (United States) Brad Sotak (Finland) Jan Nordstrom
21	Shots	33	Referees: (United States) Brad Sotak (Finland) Jan Nordstrom

=== Semi-finals ===
12 June; 18:00	United States	8 – 4 (1–0, 3–1, 2–2, 2–1)	Finland	Saturn Arena, Ingolstadt; Attendance: 1,102

			Referees: (Sweden) Sjoqvist (Sweden) Niklas Lindberg
6.0 min	Penalties	4.5 min	Referees: (Sweden) Sjoqvist (Sweden) Niklas Lindberg
38	Shots	30	Referees: (Sweden) Sjoqvist (Sweden) Niklas Lindberg

12 June; 20:00	Germany	6 – 8 (2–1, 3–3, 1–2, 0–2)	Sweden	Saturn Arena, Ingolstadt; Attendance: 3,100

			Referees: (Czech Republic) Radim Prchal (Austria) Ulrich Erd
3.0 min	Penalties	6.0 min	Referees: (Czech Republic) Radim Prchal (Austria) Ulrich Erd
46	Shots	35	Referees: (Czech Republic) Radim Prchal (Austria) Ulrich Erd

=== Bronze medal game ===
13 June; 16:00	Finland	5 – 9 (2–4, 2–1, 0–1, 1–3)	Germany	Saturn Arena, Ingolstadt; Attendance: 2,300

			Referees: (United States) Brad Sotak (Sweden) Sjoqvist
3.0 min	Penalties	4.5 min	Referees: (United States) Brad Sotak (Sweden) Sjoqvist
40	Shots	39	Referees: (United States) Brad Sotak (Sweden) Sjoqvist

=== Gold medal game ===
13 June; 18:00	United States	6 – 7 (2–2, 0–2, 3–0, 1–3)	Sweden	Saturn Arena, Ingolstadt

			Referees: (Czech Republic) Radim Prchal (Austria) Jeffrey Scott
1.5 min	Penalties	4.5 min	Referees: (Czech Republic) Radim Prchal (Austria) Jeffrey Scott
38	Shots	47	Referees: (Czech Republic) Radim Prchal (Austria) Jeffrey Scott

== Ranking and statistics ==
2009 IIHF InLine Hockey World Championship winners

Sweden
5th title

=== Tournament Awards ===
- Best players selected by the directorate:
  - Best Goalkeeper: (Sweden) Dennis Karlsson
  - Best Defenseman: (United States) Ernie Hartlieb
  - Best Forward: (Germany) Thomas Greilinger

=== Final standings ===
The final standings of the tournament according to IIHF:

Rk.	Team
1st place, gold medalist(s)	Sweden
2nd place, silver medalist(s)	United States
3rd place, bronze medalist(s)	Germany
4.	Finland
5.	Slovenia
6.	Czech Republic
7.	Canada
8.	Slovakia

=== Scoring leaders ===
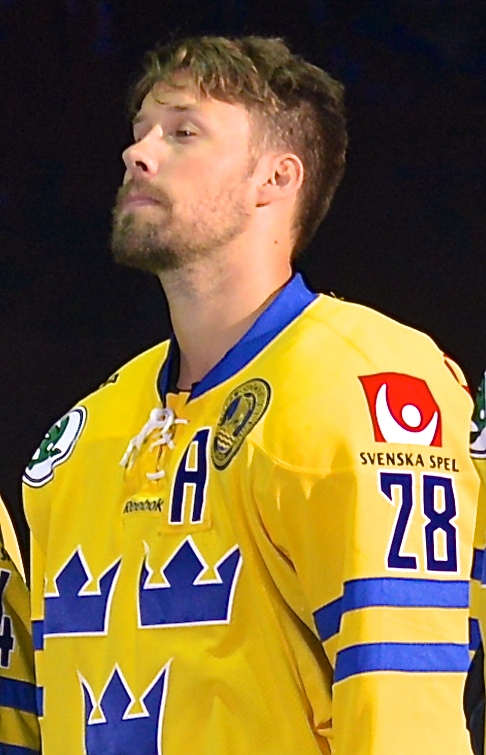
Swedens's Dick Axelsson scored eight goals and twelve assists in his six games and finished as the tournaments leading scorer

List shows the top skaters sorted by points, then goals. If the list exceeds 10 skaters because of a tie in points, all of the tied skaters are shown. Games from the qualifying round do not count towards the statistics.

Player	GP	G	A	Pts	+/–	PIM	Pos
(Sweden) Dick Axelsson	6	8	12	20	+16	9.0	F
(Germany) Thomas Greilinger	6	7	12	19	+18	1.5	F
(Sweden) Daniel Wessner	6	8	9	17	+11	14.5	F
(United States) James Beilsten	6	6	11	17	+11	4.5	D
(Germany) Patrick Reimer	6	10	5	15	+14	1.5	F
(Finland) Sami Markkanen	6	4	10	14	+8	1.5	F
(Germany) Henrik Holscher	6	6	7	13	+13	3.0	D
(Sweden) Linus Klasen	6	5	8	13	+10	0.0	F
(United States) Brian Yingling	6	7	5	12	+6	1.5	F
(Finland) Mikko Liukkonen	6	6	5	11	+6	3.0	F
(Canada) David Hammond	5	5	6	11	+8	4.5	F

=== Leading goaltenders ===
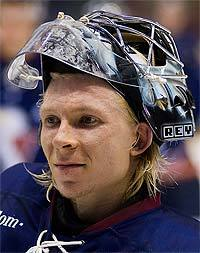
Sasu Hovi of Finland finished fourth among the goaltenders after finishing with a save percentage of 86.27

Only the top five goaltenders, based on save percentage, who have played 40% of their team's minutes are included in this list. Games from the qualifying round do not count towards the statistics.

Player	MIP	SOG	GA	GAA	SVS%	SO
(Germany) Jochen Vollmer	149:09	94	12	2.90	87.23	0
(Canada) Kevin St. Pierre	178:53	147	19	3.82	87.07	0
(Sweden) Dennis Karlsson	178:08	135	18	3.64	86.67	0
(Finland) Sasu Hovi	240:14	153	21	3.15	86.27	1
(United States) Troy Redmann	197:00	144	22	4.02	84.72	0
