= 2010 IIHF InLine Hockey World Championship =

International sports tournament

- 2010 IIHF InLine Hockey World Championship official logo

Tournament details
- Host country: Sweden
- Venue(s): 1 (in 1 host city)
- Dates: 28 June – 4 July
- Teams: 8

Final positions
- Champions: United States
- Runner-up: Czech Republic
- Third place: Sweden
- Fourth place: Canada

Tournament statistics
- Games played: 22
- Goals scored: 240 (10.91 per game)
- Scoring leader(s): (Sweden) Dick Axelsson (16 points)

Awards
- MVP: (Sweden) Dick Axelsson

The 2010 IIHF InLine Hockey World Championship was the 15th IIHF InLine Hockey World Championship, the premier annual international inline hockey tournament. It took place between 28 June and 4 July in Sweden. The games were played in the Löfbergs Lila Arena in Karlstad. The US team won the final against the Czech Republic 4–3 won their fifth title.

== Venue ==
Karlstad
Löfbergs Lila Arena
Capacity: 8,647
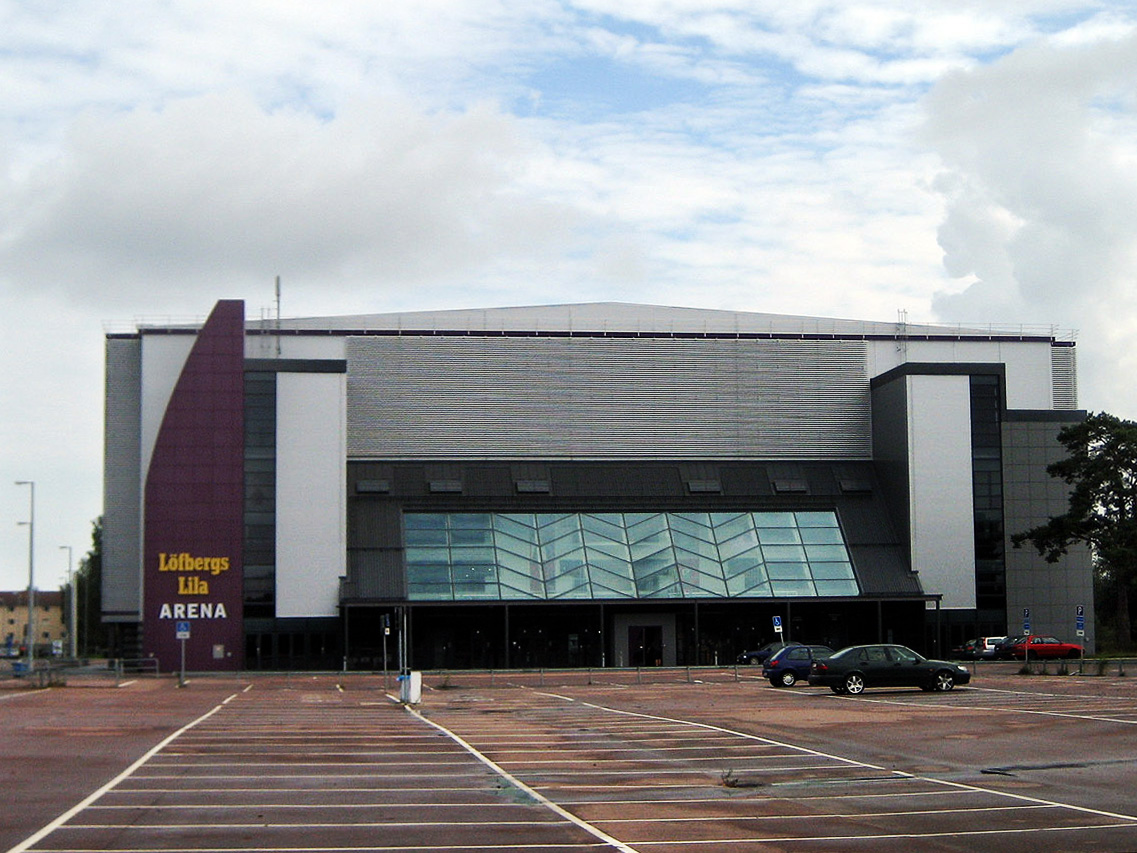

== Nations ==
The following eight nations qualified for the elite-pool tournament. Six nations from Europe, and two nations from North America were represented.

Europe

- Austria (Note: Qualified after a top placement at the 2009 IIHF InLine Hockey World Championship Division I)
- Czech Republic (Note: Automatic qualifier after a top 7 placement at the 2009 IIHF InLine Hockey World Championship)
- Finland
- Germany
- Slovenia
- Sweden (Note: Qualified as hosts)

North America

- Canada
- United States

== Seeding and groups ==
The seeding in the preliminary round was based on the final standings at the 2009 IIHF InLine Hockey World Championship and 2009 IIHF InLine Hockey World Championship Division I. The teams were grouped accordingly by seeding at the previous year's tournament (in parentheses is the corresponding seeding):

Group A

- Sweden (1)
- Finland (4)
- Slovenia (5)
- Austria (8)

Group B

- United States (2)
- Germany (3)
- Czech Republic (6)
- Canada (7)

== Rosters ==
Each team's roster for the 2010 IIHF InLine Hockey World Championship consisted of at least 8 skaters (forwards, and defencemen) and 2 goaltenders, and at most 16 skaters and 3 goaltenders.

== Preliminary round ==
Eight participating teams were placed in the following two groups. After playing a round-robin, the top three teams in each group advanced to the Playoff round. The last team in each group competed in the Qualification Games.

All games were played at the Löfbergs Lila Arena in Karlstad.

=== Group A ===
Team	Pld	W	OTW	OTL	L	GF	GA	GD	Pts	Qualification
Sweden	3	2	0	1	0	32	14	+18	7	Playoff Round
Finland	3	1	1	0	1	18	14	+4	5	Playoff Round
Slovenia	3	1	0	0	2	13	20	−7	3	Playoff Round
Austria	3	1	0	0	2	9	24	−15	3	Qualifying Games

All times are local (UTC+2).

28 June; 14:00	Finland	7–3 (0–0, 2–1, 3–1, 2–1)	Slovenia	Löfbergs Lila Arena, Karlstad; Attendance: 256

Game reference

Petri Karhu (26 saves / 23 shots)
Goalies
Gasper Kroselj (32 saves / 39 shots)
Referees:
(Austria) Ulrich Erd
(Germany) Roland Aumueller

	0–1	12:35 – Z. Jeglic (D. Zemva)
S. Markkanen (S. Viljakainen) – 19:43 (PP)	1–1
S. Markkanen (T. Lauren) – 21:46	2–1
T. Kapuppinen (T. Virtala) – 26:33	3–1
S. Markkanen (J. Laaksonen, T. Virtala) – 31:46	4–1
	4–2	33:52 – D. Zemva (Z. Jeglic, J. Loboda) (PP)
T. Suhonen – 34:15	5–2
	5–3	38:00 – D. Vedlin (D. Kadic)
J. Vijko (A. Touminen) – 40:13	6–3
T. Lauren (S. Markkanen, S. Viljakainen) – 45:21	7–3

1.5 min
Penalties
4.5 min
39
Shots
26

28 June; 20:00	Austria	4–13 (0–2, 1–5, 2–5, 1–1)	Sweden	Löfbergs Lila Arena, Karlstad; Attendance: 1,275

Game reference

Bernhard Starkbaum (21 saves / 30 shots)
Martin Werner Iberer (9 saves / 12 shots)
Goalies
Dennis Karlsson (11 saves / 15 shots)
Referees:
(Czech Republic) Radim Prchal
(Germany) Lars Bruggemann

	0–1	04:22 – A. Svensson (K. Luukkonen, M. Weinstock) (PP)
	0–2	06:35 – R. Wallin (S. Olsson)
	0–3	12:16 – K. Luukkonen (P. Lund, D. Brolin)
	0–4	13:55 – S. Olsson (P. Lund, A. Svensson) (PP)
D. Oberkofler (G. Gruger) – 18:08	1–4
	1–5	19:03 – M. Nygren (K. Luukkonen)
	1–6	21:15 – S. Olsson (R. Wallin, A. Svensson)
	1–7	22:54 – D. Axelsson (J. Andersson)
	1–8	D. Wessner (R. Wallin) (PP)
	1–9	29:29 D. Axelsson (D. Wessner)
M.Altmann (T. Auer, M. Grabher-Meier) – 30:19	2–9
	2–10	32:18 – A. Bergstrom (D. Wessner, D. Axelsson) (ENG)
	2–11	33:04 – R. Wallin (S. Olsson, J. Bergmann) (ENG)
	2–12	35:13 – D. Axelsson (A. Bergstrom, D. Wessner)
M. Pollross (C. Dolezal, Y. Riener) – 35:48	3–12
Y. Riener – 39:22	4–12
	4–13	46:29 – A. Svensson (J. Bergmann, S. Olsson) (PP)

6.0 min
Penalties
3.0 min
15
Shots
42

29 June; 14:00	Finland	2–3 (0–0, 0–0, 0–2, 2–1)	Austria	Löfbergs Lila Arena, Karlstad; Attendance: 98

Game reference

Simo Vehvilainen (23 saves / 26 shots)
Goalies
Bernhard Starkbraum (52 saves / 54 shots)
Referees:
(Sweden) Mikael Sjoqvist
(Slovenia) Crt Kralj

	0–1	29:17 – C. Dolezal (M. Pollross)
	0–2	32:29 – G. Baumgartner (S. Wiedmaier) (PP)
	0–3	38:06 – D. Oberkofler (M. Pollross, Y. Riener)
T. Hannus (S. Vehvilainen) – 41:04 (PP)	1–3
S. Markkanen (T. Hannus, C. Miettinen) – 47:16	2–3

4.5 min
Penalties
9.0 min
54
Shots
26

29 June; 20:00	Sweden	11–1 (1–1, 1–0, 4–0, 5–0)	Slovenia	Löfbergs Lila Arena, Karlstad; Attendance: 627

Game reference

Markus Dahlbom (20 saves / 21 shots)
Goalies
Gasper Kroselj (39 saves / 45 shots)
Luka Gracnar
Referees:
(Czech Republic) Petr Ulehla
(Finland) Jan Nordstrom

	0–1	03:40 – S. Rajsar (Z. Jeglic)
P. Lund (S. Olsson, D. Brolin) – 05:28	1–1
M. Nygren (R. Wallin) – 19:02 (PP)	2–1
A. Svensson (M. Weinstock, P. Lund) – 28:36 (PP)	3–1
M. Weinstock (M. Thelander, A. Bergstrom) – 31:23	4–1
A. Svensson (M. Weinstock) – 33:50 (PP)	5–1
D. Axelsson (D. Wessner, A. Bergstrom) – 35:04	6–1
D. Axelsson (A. Bergstrom, D. Wessner) – 37:11	7–1
D. Wessner (M. Weinstock) – 39:55 (PP)	8–1
D. Axelsson (A. Bergstrom, D. Wessner) – 44:38	9–1
D. Brolin (K. Luukkonen) – 45:02	10–1
R. Wallin (M. Weinstock) – 45:28	11–1

9.0 min
Penalties
12.0 min
45
Shots
21

30 June; 16:00	Slovenia	9–2 (2–0, 2–1, 1–0, 4–1)	Austria	Löfbergs Lila Arena, Karlstad; Attendance: 77

Game reference

Gasper Kroselj (19 saves / 21 shots)
Goalies
Bernhard Starkbaum (28 saves / 38 shots)
Martin Werner Iberer (7 saves / 8 shots)
Referees:
(Canada) Carl Friday
(Finland) Tony Kuloaro

M. Manfreda (M. Kralj) – 02:35	1–0
M. Erman (D. Vedlin, Z. Jeglic) – 11:20	2–0
	2–1	17:19 – D. Oberkofler (H. Lange, G. Gruber)
D. Zemva (M. Kralj) – 21:13	3–1
R. Ticar (Z. Jeglic, J. Loboda) – 22:13	4–1
D. Vedlin (D. Kadic) – 30:39 (PP)	5–1
D. Vedlin (D. Zemva, D. Kadic) – 36:29 (PP)	6–1
Z. Jeglic – 39:25 (PP)	7–1
D. Zemva (D. Kadic) – 40:01 (PP)	8–1
S. Rajsar (Z. Jeglic) – 45:05	9–1
	9–2	47:10 – C. Dolezal (D. Oberkofler)

6.0 min
Penalties
22.0 min
44
Shots
21

30 June; 20:00	Sweden	8–9 (OT) (2–3, 3–0, 3–2, 1–3) (OT 0–1)	Finland	Löfbergs Lila Arena, Karlstad; Attendance: 2,127

Game reference

Markus Dahlbom (22 saves / 31 shots)
Goalies
Petri Karhu (41 saves / 49 shots)
Referees:
(United States) Kevin Lord
(United States) Don Moffatt

D. Axelsson (D. Wessner) – 06:17	1–0
	1–1	07:01 – S. Viljakainen (S. Markkanen, T. Virtala)
	1–2	07:26 – T. Suhonen (T. Lauren, J. Laaksonen)
	1–3	08:35 – S. Viljakainen (C. Miettinen, S. Makkanen)
M. Weinstock (M. Nygren, A. Svensson) – 10:21	2–3
A. Svensson (P. Lund) – 15:21 (PP)	3–3
D. Wessner (R. Wallin, D. Axelsson) – 19:36 (PP)	4–3
	4–4	24:41 – C. Miettinen (T. Kauppinen, J. Vihko) (PP)
	4–5	26:12 – T. Virtala (T. Hannus) (PP)
S. Olsson (K. Luukkonen, D. Brolin) – 26:31	5–5
M. Weinstock – 33:05	6–5
M. Weinstock (P. Lund, A. Svensson) – 35:52 (PP)	7–5
	7–6	37:07 – C. Miettinen (T. Makiaho) (PP)
S. Olsson (K. Luukkonen) – 37:16	8–6
	8–7	37:44 – T. Suhonen (T. Kauppinen)
	8–8	44:03 – J. Vihko (M. Jokinen, J. Laaksonen)
	8–9	52:48 – T. Makiaho (J. Laaksonen)

13.5 min
Penalties
21.0 min
49
Shots
31

=== Group B ===
Team	Pld	W	OTW	OTL	L	GF	GA	GD	Pts	Qualification
United States	3	3	0	0	0	21	7	+14	9	Playoff Round
Czech Republic	3	2	0	0	1	13	12	+1	6	Playoff Round
Canada	3	0	1	0	2	6	14	−8	2	Playoff Round
Germany	3	0	0	1	2	16	23	−7	1	Qualifying Games

All times are local (UTC+2).

28 June; 16:00	Germany	8–9 (1–3, 3–1, 3–2, 1–3)	Czech Republic	Löfbergs Lila Arena, Karlstad; Attendance: 185

Game reference

Jochen Vollmer (33 saves / 39 shots)
Thomas Ower
Goalies
Ondrej Jirkuv (11 saves / 18 shots)
Roman Handl (3 saves / 4 shots)
Referees:
(Finland) Jan Nordstrom
(United States) Don Moffatt

	0–1	01:59 – Z. Kubica (D. Sebek)
T. Greilinger (P. Reimer, H. Holscher) – 03:52	1–1
	1–2	07:00 – J. Polansky (P. Sebek, M. Vozdecky)
	1–3	09:06 – J. Rudovsky (P. Sebek)
T. Greilinger (P. Reimer, H. Holscher) – 14:49 (PP)	2–3
T. Greilinger ((P. Reimer, H. Holscher) – 16:06 (PP)	3–3
A. Duck (B. Blank, D. Menge) – 17:24 (PP)	4–3
	4–4	20:30 – J. Polansky (A. Jirik, M. Vozdecky)
M. Bazany (P. Reimer) – 24:52	5–4
	5–5	25:52 – P. Sebek (SH)
P. Buzas (V. Holzmann) – 27:20	6–5
	6–6	27:41 – J. Rudovsky (J. Polansky, A. Jirik)
V. Holzmann – 31:03	7–6
	7–7	37:57 – J. Besser (D. Sebek, M. Vozdecky)
	7–8	38:13 – Z. Kubica (D. Sebek, MJ. Besser)
	7–9	42:01 – P. Sebek (P. Strycek, J. Polansky)
A. Duck (D. Menge, B. Blank) – 45:39	8–9

4.5 min
Penalties
7.5 min
22
Shots
39

28 June; 18:00	Canada	2–7 (0–3, 0–1, 2–3, 0–0)	United States	Löfbergs Lila Arena, Karlstad; Attendance: 330

Game reference

Brett Leggat (24 saves / 31 shots)
Goalies
Thomas Tartaglione (15 saves / 17 shots)
Referees:
(Sweden) Mikael Sjoqvist
(Sweden) Niklas Lindberg

	0–1	K. Kraemer (P. Lee) – 03:33
	0–2	A. Miner (J. Chavira, N. Sigmund) – 07:59
	0–3	J. Chavira (P. Lee, K. Kraemer) – 10:03
	0–4	J. Beilsten (R. Rodriquez, C. Yoder) – 13:53
	0–5	K. Kraemer (S. Campbell, P. Lee) – 27:38
C. Terry – 28:11	1–5
	1–6	A. Miner (N. Sigmund, G. Osterkamp) – 29:45
D. Hammond – 30:28	2–6
	2–7	J. Beilsten – 34:46

7.5 min
Penalties
3.0 min
17
Shots
31

29 June; 16:00	Germany	3–4 (GWS) (2–1, 1–0, 0–1, 0–1) (OT 0–0) (SO 1–0)	Canada	Löfbergs Lila Arena, Karlstad; Attendance: 123

Game reference

Thomas Ower (34 saves / 37 shots)
Goalies
Brett Leggat (22 saves / 25 shots)
Referees:
(Finland) Tony Kuloaro
(Sweden) Michael Ericsson

T. Greilinger (M. Bazany, P. Reimer) – 04:21 (PP)	1–0
	1–1	08:47 – K. Benjaminsen (M. Vevang)
Y Baier (S. Tolzer) – 10:54	2–1
S. Tolzer (Y. Baier, B. Friedl) – 20:21	3–1
	3–2	35:56 – K. Benjaminsen (K. Sheen) (PP)
	3–3	41:31 – D. Hammond
	3–4	53:00 – D. Hammond (GWG)

9.0 min
Penalties
4.5 min
25
Shots
38

29 June; 18:00	United States	4–0 (1–0, 3–0, 0–0, 0–0)	Czech Republic	Löfbergs Lila Arena, Karlstad; Attendance: 130

Game reference

Troy Redmann (27 saves / 27 shots)
Thomas Tartaglione
Goalies
Roman Handl (18 saves / 22 shots)
Referees:
(Canada) Carl Friday
(Australia) Jeffrey Scott

P. Maroon (K. Kraemer, G. Osterkamp) – 06:03	1–0
S. Gawrys (G. Osterkamp, A. Miner) – 15:04	2–0
N. Sigmund (J. Beilsten) – 18:03	3–0
S. Hawrys (C. Yoder) – 23:03	4–0

7.5 min
Penalties
10.5 min
22
Shots
27

30 June; 14:00	Czech Republic	4–0 (0–0, 0–0, 2–0, 2–0)	Canada	Löfbergs Lila Arena, Karlstad; Attendance: 72

Game reference

Roman Handl (22 saves / 22 shots)
Goalies
Brett Leggat (34 saves / 38 shots)
Taylor Pears (7 saves / 7 shots)
Referees:
(Germany) Lars Bruggemann
(Austria) Ulrich Erd

A. Jirik (J. Rudovsky) – 27:16	1–0
A. Jirik (J. Rudovsky) – 33:18	2–0
J. Vlcek (J. Besser, Z. Kubica)) – 41:52	3–0
P. Sebek (J. Polansky, J. Rudovsky) – 44:25	4–0

6.0 min
Penalties
9.0 min
45
Shots
22

30 June; 18:00	United States	10–5 (1–0, 5–0, 2–3, 2–2)	Germany	Löfbergs Lila Arena, Karlstad

Game reference

Thomas Tartaglione (24 saves / 29 shots)
Goalies
Jochen Vollmer (5 saves / 11 shots)
Thomas Ower (11 saves / 15 shots)
Referees:
(Czech Republic) Radim Prchal
(Czech Republic) Petr Ulehla

S. Gawrys (P. Maroon) – 10:10	1–0
P. Maroon (C. Yoder) – 13:51	2–0
P. Maroon (J. Beilsten) – 14:25	3–0
N. Sigmund (A. Miner) – 17:54	4–0
R. Rodriquez – 21:16	5–0
K. Kraemer (T. Tartaglione) – 21:44	6–0
S. Gawrys (P. Maroon) – 26:02	7–0
	7–1	32:09 – P. Reimer (T. Greilinger) (PP)
	7–2	33:08 – P. Buzas (S. Tolzer, D. Menge) (PP)
K. Kraemer (P. Lee) – 33:28	8–2
	8–3	35:39 – P. Buzas (A. Duck)
K. Kraemer (P. Lee, S. Campbell) – 40:49	9–3
	9–4	43:48 – P. Seifert
	9–5	44:19 – P. Buzas (P. Reimer)
K. Kraemer (P. Lee) – 46:11	10–5

6.0 min
Penalties
3.0 min
26
Shots
29

== Qualification games ==
The last team from each group of the Preliminary Round competed in the Qualification Games against the top team from each group of the Division I tournament's Preliminary round. They were placed into two games: teams from Groups A and C played each other in Group A/C, while teams from Groups B and D played each other in Group B/D.

The two winners of these games advanced to the Top Division Playoff Round. In the Top Division Playoff Round, the winner of the A/C game was seeded A4, while the winner of the B/D game was seeded B4.

The two losers of these games were relegated to the Division I Playoff Round. In the Division I Playoff Round, the loser of the A/C game was seeded C1, while the winner of the B/D game was seeded D1.

=== Game A/C ===
Team	Pld	W	OTW	OTL	L	GF	GA	GD	Pts	Qualification
Slovakia	1	1	0	0	0	6	2	+4	3	Top Division Playoff Round
Austria	1	0	0	0	1	2	6	−4	0	Division I Playoff Round

Time is local (UTC+2).

1 July; 18:00	Austria	2–6 (0–1, 1–1, 0–2, 1–2)	Slovakia	Löfbergs Lila Arena, Karlstad; Attendance: 293

Game reference

Bernhard Starkbaum (20 saves / 25 shots)
Goalies
Jozef Ondrejka (29 saves / 31 shots)
Referees:
(Germany) Lars Brueggemann
(Finland) Jan Nordstrom

	0–1	09:03 – M. Cunderlik (B. Ertel, M. Galik) (PP)
S. Wiedmaier (M. Altmann, G. Baumgartner) – 18:41	1–1
	1–2	23:21 – M. Galik (B. Ertel, M. Cunderlik) (PP)
	1–3	29:33 – H. Ruckay (M. Galik, M. Preisinger)
	1–4	33:26 – H. Ruckay (M. Galik)
D. Oberkofler (G. Baumgartner, G. Gruber) – 38:35	2–4
	2–5	42:35 – H. Ruckay (M. Galik, L. Martinka)
	2–6	45:59 – M. Cunderlik (J. Martinka, J. Ondrejka)

3.0 min
Penalties
10.5 min
31
Shots
26

=== Game B/D ===
Team	Pld	W	OTW	OTL	L	GF	GA	GD	Pts	Qualification
Germany	1	1	0	0	0	3	2	+1	3	Top Division Playoff Round
Great Britain	1	0	0	0	1	2	3	−1	0	Division I Playoff Round

Time is local (UTC+2).

1 July; 16:00	Germany	3–2 (2–1, 0–0, 0–0, 1–1)	Great Britain	Löfbergs Lila Arena, Karlstad; Attendance: 212

Game reference

Jochen Vollmer (18 saves / 20 shots)
Goalies
James Tanner (26 saves / 29 shots)
Referees:
(Austria) Ulrich Erd
(Czech Republic) Petr Ulehla

P. Reimer (T. Greilinger) – 01:42	1–0
A. Duck (B. Blank, D. Menge) – 02:59	2–0
	2–1	05:11 – D. Hutchinson (R. Moses, N. Finney)
T. Greilinger (S. Tolzer, M. Bazany) – 42:01	3–1
	3–2	46:37 – A. Pearman (P. Hamer)

7.5 min
Penalties
4.5 min
29
Shots
20

== Playoff round ==
=== Bracket ===
Quarterfinals
A1	United States	9
B4	Slovakia	0
B2	Finland	8
A3	Canada	10
B1	Sweden	6
A4	Germany	4
A2	Czech Republic	7
B3	Slovenia	2

Semifinals
QF1	United States	12
QF2	Canada	3
QF3	Sweden	3
QF4	Czech Republic	4

Finals
SF1	United States	4
SF2	Czech Republic	3
Bronze medal game
SF1	Canada	6
SF2	Sweden	7

=== Quarter-finals ===
All times are local (UTC+2).

2 July; 14:00	Finland	8–10 (4–5, 2–1, 0–2, 2–2)	Canada	Löfbergs Lila Arena, Karlstad; Attendance: 127

Game reference

Simo Vehvilainen (16 saves / 22 shots)
Petri Karhu (13 saves / 17 shots)
Goalies
Taylor Pears (18 saves / 22 shots)
Brett Leggat (4 saves / 8 shots)
Referees:
(Austria) Ulrich Erd
(Germany) Roland Aumueller

	0–1	01:43 – C. Terry (J. Carter)
	0–2	04:11 – J. Carter
T. Makiaho (C. Miettinen, T. Kauppinen) – 06:31 (PP)	1–2
	1–3	07:23 – T. Woods (J. Carter)
T. Hannus (S. Viljakainen, S. Markkanen) – 07:41	2–3
J. Vihko (A. Tuominen, C: Miettinen) – 08:20	3–3
T. Makiaho (T. Virtala, T. Kauppinen) – 08:40	4–3
	4–4	09:09 – D. Hammond
	4–5	11:24 – C. Terry (D. Hammond, J. Carter) (PP)
T. Makiaho (T. Virtala, S. Markkanen) – 13:07	5–5
S. Markkanen (T. Hannus, T. Virtala) – 15:39 (PP)	6–5
	6–6	21:28 – C. Terry (D. Hammond) (PP)
	6–7	30:11 – J. Carter
	6–8	32:49 – C. Terry (D. Eison)
	6–9	40:54 – T. Woods (F. Corbeil)
T. Virtala (K. Lohtander, S. Markkanen) – 42:14 (PP)	7–9
	7–10	45:48 – L. Ciotti (D: Hammond)
T. Hannus (S. Markkanen, T. Makiaho) – 46:30	8–10

7.5 min
Penalties
7.5 min
30
Shots
39

2 July; 16:00	Czech Republic	7–2 (1–1, 2–0, 4–0, 0–1)	Slovenia	Löfbergs Lila Arena, Karlstad; Attendance: 86

Game reference

Roman Handl (12 saves / 14 shots)
Goalies
Gasper Kroselj (20 saves / 27 shots)
Luka Gracnar (3 saves / 3 shots)
Referees:
(United States) Kevin Lord
(United States) Don Moffatt

	0–1	07:14 – J. Loboda (R. Ticar, M. Kralj) (PP)
M. Vavrusa (P. Strycek) – 10:50	1–1
J. Rudovsky (M. Vavrusa) – 23:02 (SH)	2–1
M. Vozdecky (P. Sebek, P. Strycek) – 23:43	3–1
J. Polandsky (P. Sebek, M. Vozdecky) – 27:06 (PP)	4–1
J. Besser (D. Sebek, L. Vlcek) – 27:54 (PP)	5–1
M. Vozdecky	6–1
J. Polansky (P. Sebek, M. Vozdecky) – 34:53	7–1
	7–2	38:23 – S. Rajsar (K. Ograjensek)

6.0 min
Penalties
4.5 min
30
Shots
14

2 July; 18:00	United States	9–0 (3–0, 2–0, 2–0, 2–0)	Slovakia	Löfbergs Lila Arena, Karlstad; Attendance: 172

Game reference

Thomas Trataglione (16 saves / 16 shots)
Goalies
Jozef Ondrejka (33 saves / 42 shots)
Referees:
(Finland) Jan Nordstrom
(Czech Republic) Petr Ulehla

J. Chavira (N. Sigmund) – 00:49	1–0
C. Yoder (S. Gawrys) – 03:45 (PP)	2–0
G. Osterkamp (J. Beilsten) – 10:20 (SH)	3–0
N. Sigmund – 16:17	4–0
S. Gawrys (P. Maroon, C. Yoder) – 23:27	5–0
P. Maroon (S. Gawrys) – 34:17	6–0
J. Beilsten (S. Gawrys, P. maroon) – 35:17 (PP)	7–0
K. Kraemer – 38:09	8–0
N. Sigmund (G. Osterkamp) – 45:26	9–0

3.0 min
Penalties
9.0 min
42
Shots
16

2 July; 20:00	Sweden	6–4 (3–1, 1–1, 1–1, 1–1)	Germany	Löfbergs Lila Arena, Karlstad; Attendance: 667

Game reference

Dennis Karlsson
Goalies
Thomas Ower
Referees:
(Australia) Jeffrey Scott
(Slovenia) Crt Kralj

A. Svensson (R. Wallin) – 01:28	1–0
D. Axelsson (D. Wessner, M. Thelander) – 02:49	2–0
K. Luukkonen – 07:45	3–0
	3–1	08:27 – A. Duck (P. Buzas, B. Blank)
D. Axelsson (M. Nygren) – 12:17 (PP)	4–1
	4–2	17:53 – B. Blank (A. Duck) (PP)
D. Axelsson (M. Thelander) – 32:06	5–2
	5–3	34:03 – T. Greilinger (P. Reimer, H. Holscher) (PP)
D. Axelsson (M. Thelander) – 38:56	6–3
	6–4	43:42 – T. Greilinger (M. Bazany, P. Reimer)

9.0 min
Penalties
10.5 min
40
Shots
30

=== Placement ===
==== 7/8 placement ====
Time is local (UTC+2).

3 July; 14:00	Slovakia	4–6 (1–2, 2–1, 1–2, 0–1)	Germany	Löfbergs Lila Arena, Karlstad; Attendance: 48

Game reference

Jozef Ondrejka (38 saves / 44 shots)
Goalies
Jochen Vollmer (11 saves / 14 shots)
Thomas Ower (17 saves / 18 shots)
Referees:
(Finland) Jan Nordstrom
(Finland) Tony Kuloaro

	0–1	04:27 – T. Greilinger (A. Duck, P. Reimer)
	0–2	04:46 – A. Duck (P. Seifert)
H. Ruckay (M. Galik, B. Ertel) – 10:01	1–2
M. Siller (P. Trska) – 14:38 (PP)	2–2
	2–3	21:02 – H. Holscher (M. Bazany)
H. Ruckay (M. Cunderlik) – 22:43	3–3
M. Cunderlik (H. Ruckay, B. Ertel) – 25:42	4–3
	4–4	32:47 – H. Holscher (T. Greilinger) (PP)
	4–5	33:26 – A. Duck (B. Friedl)
	4–6	40:19 – A. Duck (P. Buzas, P. Seifert) (PP)

9.0 min
Penalties
3.0 min
32
Shots
44

==== 5/6 placement ====
Time is local (UTC+2).

3 July; 16:00	Slovenia	9–5 (1–0, 2–3, 2–1, 4–1)	Finland	Löfbergs Lila Arena, Karlstad; Attendance: 88

Game reference

Gasper Kroselj (33 saves / 38 shots)
Goalies
Petri Karhu (32 saves / 41 shots)
Referees:
(Germany) Lars Brueggemann
(Sweden) Niklas Lindberg

R. Sabolic (D. Zemva) – 05:29	1–0
M. Erman (M. Kralj) – 15:55	2–0
	2–1	16:33 – T. Virtala (T. Kauppinen)
	2–2	18:40 – K. Lohtander (S. Viljakainen, S. Markkanen)
Z. Jeglic (R. Ticar) – 19:16	3–2
	3–3	20:48 – R. Lehtila (T. Hannus)
R. Ticar (Z. Jeglic) – 24:35	4–3
Z. Jeglic (R. Ticar) – 27:26	5–3
	5–4	28:11 – T. Suhonen (T. Virtala, S. Markkanen)
Z. Jeglic (R. Ticar, M. Kralj) – 42:29 (PP)	6–4
R. Sabolic (D. Zemva) – 43:36	7–4
Z. Jeglic (R. Ticar) – 43:42	8–4
	8–5	44:55 – T. Lauren
R. Sabolic – 47:01	9–5

3.0 min
Penalties
7.5 min
41
Shots
38

=== Semi-finals ===
All times are local (UTC+2).

3 July; 18:00	United States	12–3 (3–0, 2–0, 5–2, 2–1)	Canada	Löfbergs Lila Arena, Karlstad; Attendance: 329

Game reference

Troy Redmann (17 saves / 20 shots)
Goalies
Brett Leggat (15 saves / 20 shots)
Taylor Pears (12 saves / 19 shots)
Referees:
(Czech Republic) Radim Prchal
(Sweden) Mikael Sjoqvist

P. Maroon (S. Gawrys) – 03:11 (PP)	1–0
S. Gawrys (C. Yoder, A. Miner) – 06:17	2–0
N. Sigmund – 08:18 (SH)	3–0
P. Maroon (C. Yoder, J. Beilsten) – 13:00 (PP)	4–0
K. Kraemer (S. Campbell) – 19:07	5–0
G. Osterkamp (P. Maroon, S. Gawrys) – 25:04 (PP)	6–0
S. Campbell (K. Kraemer) – 26:18	7–0
	7–1	28:12 – T. Woods (J. Carter)
S. Gawrys (C. Yoder) – 28:41	8–1
S. Gawrys (P. Maroon) – 28:51	9–1
K. Kraemer (A. Minder, G. Osterkamp) – 32:03	10–1
	10–2	34:29 – D. Hammond (C. Terry)
	10–3	42:20 – D. Hammond
J. Chavira – 45:59	11–3
P. Lee – 47:49	12–3

3.0 min
Penalties
6.0 min
39
Shots
20

3 July; 20:00	Sweden	3–4 (0–1, 1–0, 0–1, 2–2)	Czech Republic	Löfbergs Lila Arena, Karlstad; Attendance: 629

Game reference

Dennis Karlsson (17 saves / 21 shots)
Goalies
Roman Handl (36 saves / 39 shots)
Referees:
(United States) Kevin Lord
(Canada) Carl Friday

	0–1	07:27 – Z. Kubica (D. Sebek, L. Vlcek)
D. Axelsson (R. Wallin, M. Nygren) – 17:35 (PP)	1–1
	1–2	31:31 – J. Polansky (P. Sebek, P. Strycek)
M. Weinstock (M. Thelander) – 39:24	2–2
D. Axelsson (D. Wessner) – 41:35	3–2
	3–3	43:50 – J. Rudovsky (P. Sebek)
	3–4	46:22 – M. Vozdecky (P. Strycek)

10.5 min
Penalties
9.0 min
39
Shots
21

=== Bronze medal game ===
Time is local (UTC+2).

4 July; 16:00	Canada	6–7 (0–3, 2–1, 1–2, 3–1)	Sweden	Löfbergs Lila Arena, Karlstad; Attendance: 1,150

Game reference

Brett Leggat (26 saves / 33 shots)
Goalies
Dennis Karlsson (34 saves / 40 shots)
Referees:
(Germany) Roland Aumueller
(Czech Republic) Radim Prchal

	0–1	00:14 – A. Bergstrom (M. Thelander, A. Svensson)
	0–2	05:21 – P. Lund (S. Olsson)
	0–3	09:37 – D. Axelsson (A. Svensson, M. Thelander) (PP)
T. Woods (C. Terry) – 18:13 (PP)	1–3
K. Benjaminsen – 18:50	2–3
	2–4	21:42 – M. Nygren (M. Weinstock, D. Brolin) (PP)
	2–5	31:53 – A. Svensson (K. Luukkonen)
C. Terry (D. Hammond) – 32:46	3–5
	3–6	34:05 – A. Svensson (K. Luukkonen)
D. Hammond (C. Terry, K. Benjaminsen) – 37:15 (PP)	4–6
	4–7	40:01 – M. Weinstock (D. Brolin) (PP)
F. Corbeil – 44:18	5–7
D. Hammond (K. Benjaminsen) – 47:30	6–7

25.0 min
Penalties
22.0 min
40
Shots
33

=== Gold medal game ===
Time is local (UTC+2).

4 July; 18:00	Czech Republic	3–4 (1–1, 0–1, 1–1, 1–1)	United States	Löfbergs Lila Arena, Karlstad; Attendance: 1,537

Game reference

Roman Handl (23 saves / 27 shots)
Goalies
Troy Redmann (18 saves / 21 shots)
Referees:
(Finland) Jan Nordstrom
(Sweden) Mikael Sjoqvist

	0–1	03:45 – K. Kraemer (P. Lee)
M. Vozdecky (J. Polansky, P. Sebek) – 04:37	1–1
	1–2	17:09 – K. Kraemer (P. Lee)
P. Sebek (A. Jirik) – 27:54	2–2
	2–3	30:49 – P. Maroon (J. Beilsten)
J. Polansky (M. Vozdecky) – 38:31	3–3
	3–4	42:54 – S. Gawrys (P. Maroon, C. Yoder)

3.0 min
Penalties
3.0 min
21
Shots
27

== Ranking and statistics ==
2010 IIHF InLine Hockey World Championship winners

United States
5th title

=== Tournament Awards ===
- Best players selected by the directorate:
  - Best Goalkeeper: (Czech Republic) Roman Handl
  - Best Defenseman: (Finland) Sami Markkanen
  - Best Forward: (United States) Nathan Sigmund
  - Most Valuable Player: (Sweden) Dick Axelsson

=== Final standings ===
The final standings of the tournament according to IIHF:

Rk.	Team
1st place, gold medalist(s)	United States
2nd place, silver medalist(s)	Czech Republic
3rd place, bronze medalist(s)	Sweden
4.	Canada
5.	Slovenia
6.	Finland
7.	Germany
8.	Slovakia

=== Scoring leaders ===
List shows the top skaters sorted by points, then goals. If the list exceeds 10 skaters because of a tie in points, all of the tied skaters are shown.

Player	GP	G	A	Pts	+/−	PIM	POS
(Sweden) Dick Axelsson	6	14	2	16	+9	16.0	FW
(Sweden) Andreas Svensson	6	8	7	15	−1	3.0	DF
(United States) Kyle Kraemer	6	11	3	14	+13	1.5	FW
(United States) Shawn Gawrys	6	9	5	14	+5	6.0	FW
(United States) Patrick Maroon	6	7	7	14	+5	0	FW
(Finland) Sami Markkanen	5	4	10	14	−1	0	DF
(Canada) David Hammond	6	8	4	12	−2	3.0	FW
(Slovenia) Ziga Jeglic	5	7	5	12	−1	0	FW
(Sweden) Marcus Weinstock	6	6	6	12	−6	1.5	FW
(Czech Republic) Patrik Sebek	6	4	8	12	+3	0	DF
(Sweden) Daniel Wessner	6	3	9	12	+4	7.5	FW

GP = Games played; G = Goals; A = Assists; Pts = Points; +/− = Plus/minus; PIM = Penalties in minutes; POS = Position

Source: IIHF.com

18:32, 4 July 2010 (UTC) (UTC)

=== Leading goaltenders ===
Only the top five goaltenders, based on save percentage, who have played 40% of their team's minutes are included in this list.

Player	TOI	SA	GA	GAA	Sv%	SO
(United States) Troy Redmann	138:28	68	6	1.56	91.18	1
(Czech Republic) Roman Handl	251:50	128	14	2.00	89.06	1
(United States) Thomas Tartaglione	147:27	62	7	1.71	88.71	1
(Austria) Bernhard Starkbaum*	117:51	120	18	5.50	85.00	0
(Germany) Thomas Ower	159:51	110	17	3.83	84.55	0

TOI = Time on ice (minutes:seconds); SA = Shots against; GA = Goals against; GAA = Goals against average; Sv% = Save percentage; SO = Shutouts
Asterisk (*) denotes that the player's team was demoted to the Division I tournament after the qualification games.

Source: IIHF.com

18:35, 4 July 2010 (UTC)

== See also ==
- 2010 IIHF InLine Hockey World Championship Division I
- 2009 IIHF InLine Hockey World Championship
- 2011 IIHF InLine Hockey World Championship
