= Löfbergs Arena =

Event arena in Karlstad, Sweden

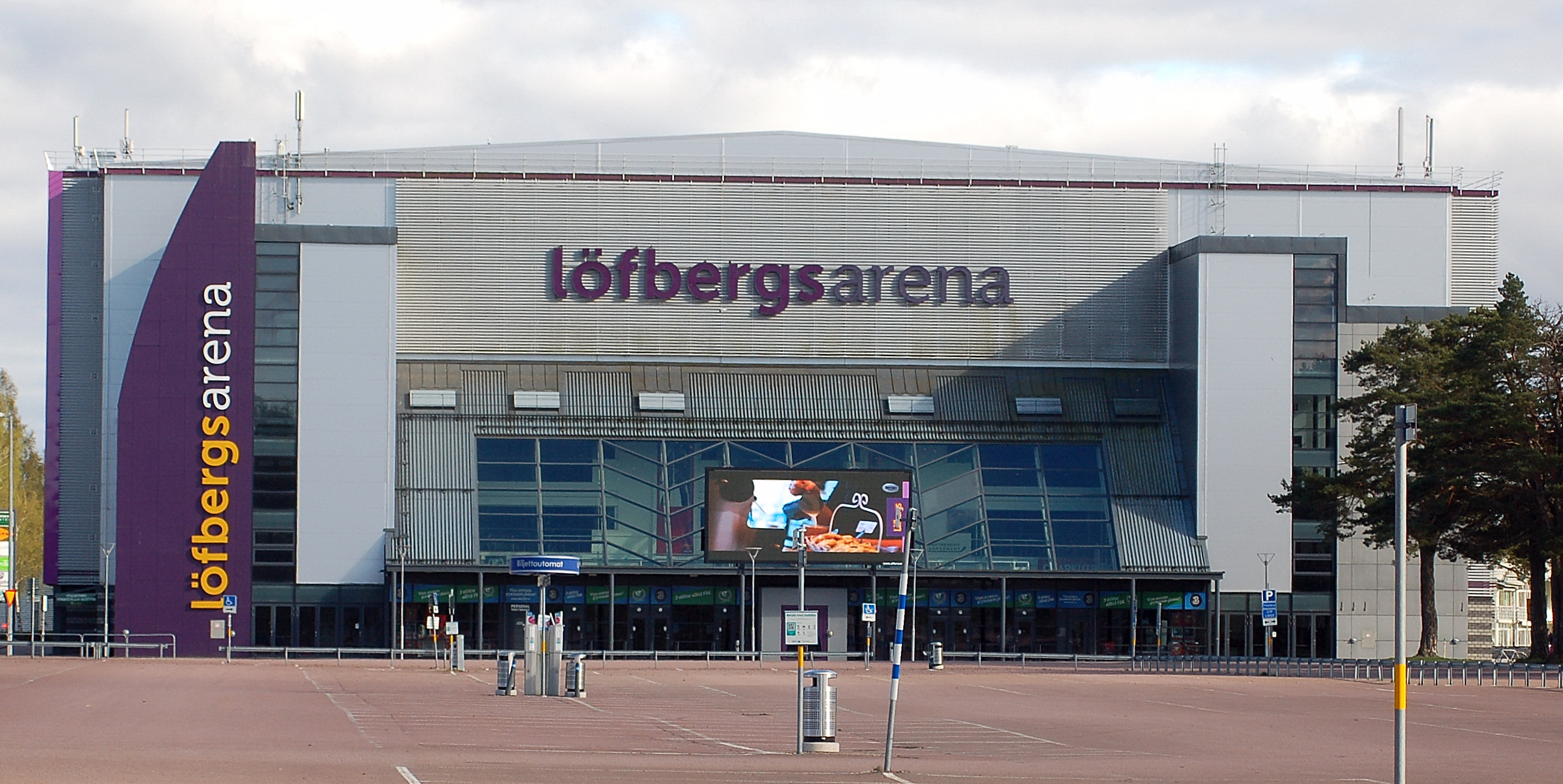
- Interactive map of Löfbergs Arena
- Former names: Löfbergs Lila Arena (2001–2013)
- Location: Norra Infarten 78; 651 08 Karlstad
- Coordinates: 59°24′27″N 13°30′03″E
- Owner: Färjestad BK
- Operator: Färjestad BK
- Capacity: Ice hockey: 8,645; Concerts: 10,300

Construction
- Groundbreaking: 19 June 2000
- Opened: 15 September 2001
- Renovated: 2008–2009
- Expanded: 2002, 2004, 2009
- Cost: 160 million SEK
- Architects: Ulf Bergfjord, Bergfjord & Ivarsson Arkiteter Karlstad

Tenant
- Färjestad BK (SHL) (2001–present)

Löfbergs Arena is an arena located in Karlstad, Sweden, situated just above the river delta of Klarälven. It is primarily used for ice hockey, and is the home arena of Färjestad BK.

It opened in 2001 following a complete overhaul and major expansion of the previously existing arena Färjestads Ishall. It replaced Färjestads Ishall as the home of Färjestad and has a capacity of 8,647 people. The name of the arena comes from the coffee roastery Löfbergs.

== Events ==
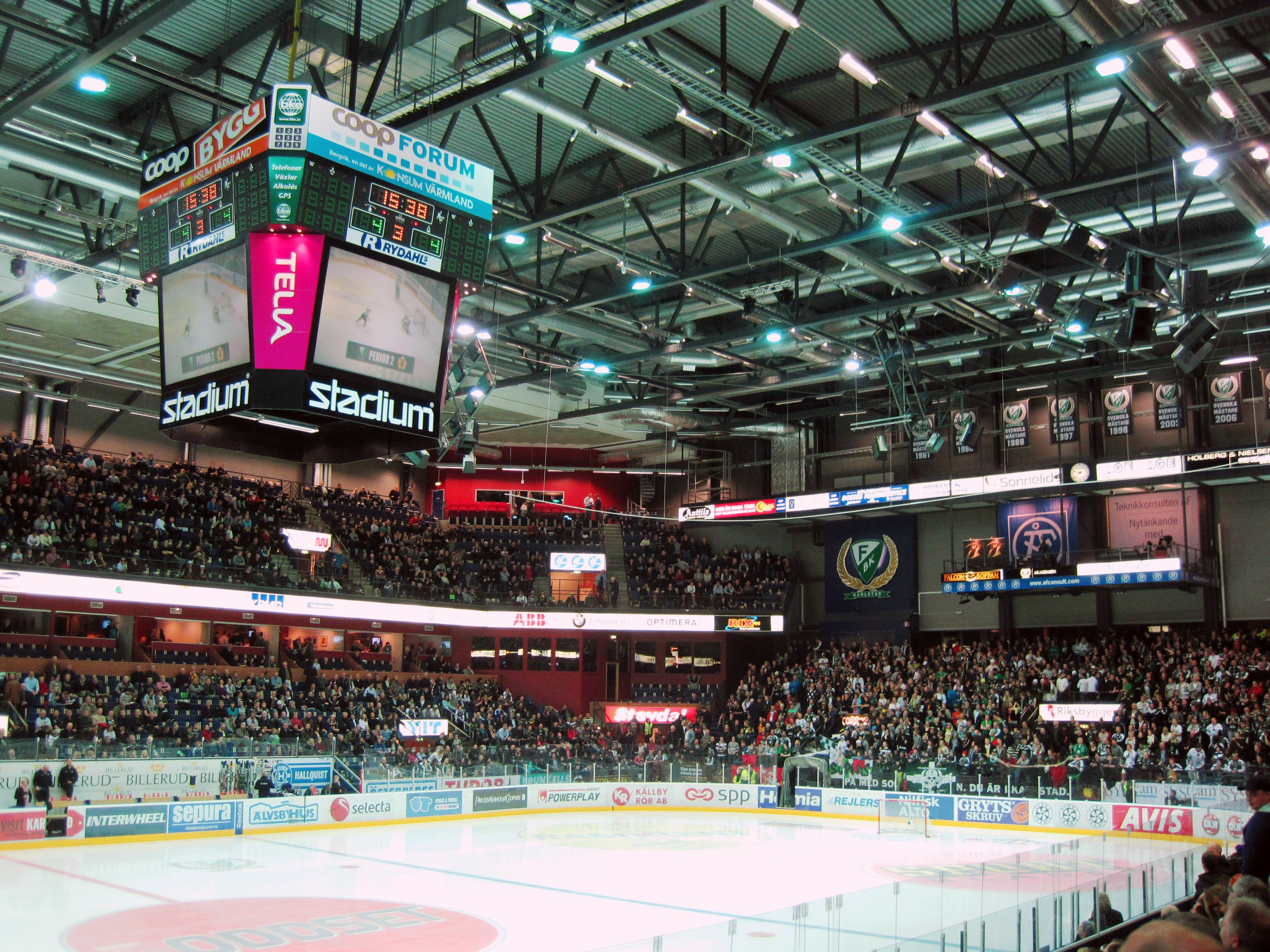
Löfbergs Arena during period break

In 2004, 2006, 2018 and 2024, the arena hosted a semi-final of Melodifestivalen. Other notable music artists and groups who have performed at the arena include Elton John, Bob Dylan, John Fogerty, Bryan Adams, Dolly Parton, Rod Stewart, Motörhead and Judas Priest.

On 30 September 2009 Färjestad BK faced off against the NHL's Detroit Red Wings in an exhibition match from the arena, losing 6–2.

The arena was named the host of the 2010 Men's World Inline Hockey Championships, as well as the 2012 European Curling Championships.

The venue hosted the fifth heat of Melodifestivalen 2024.

== See also ==
- List of indoor arenas in Sweden
- List of indoor arenas in Nordic countries
