= Saturn Arena =

Arena in Ingolstadt, Germany

Coordinates: 48°45′33″N 11°26′20″E

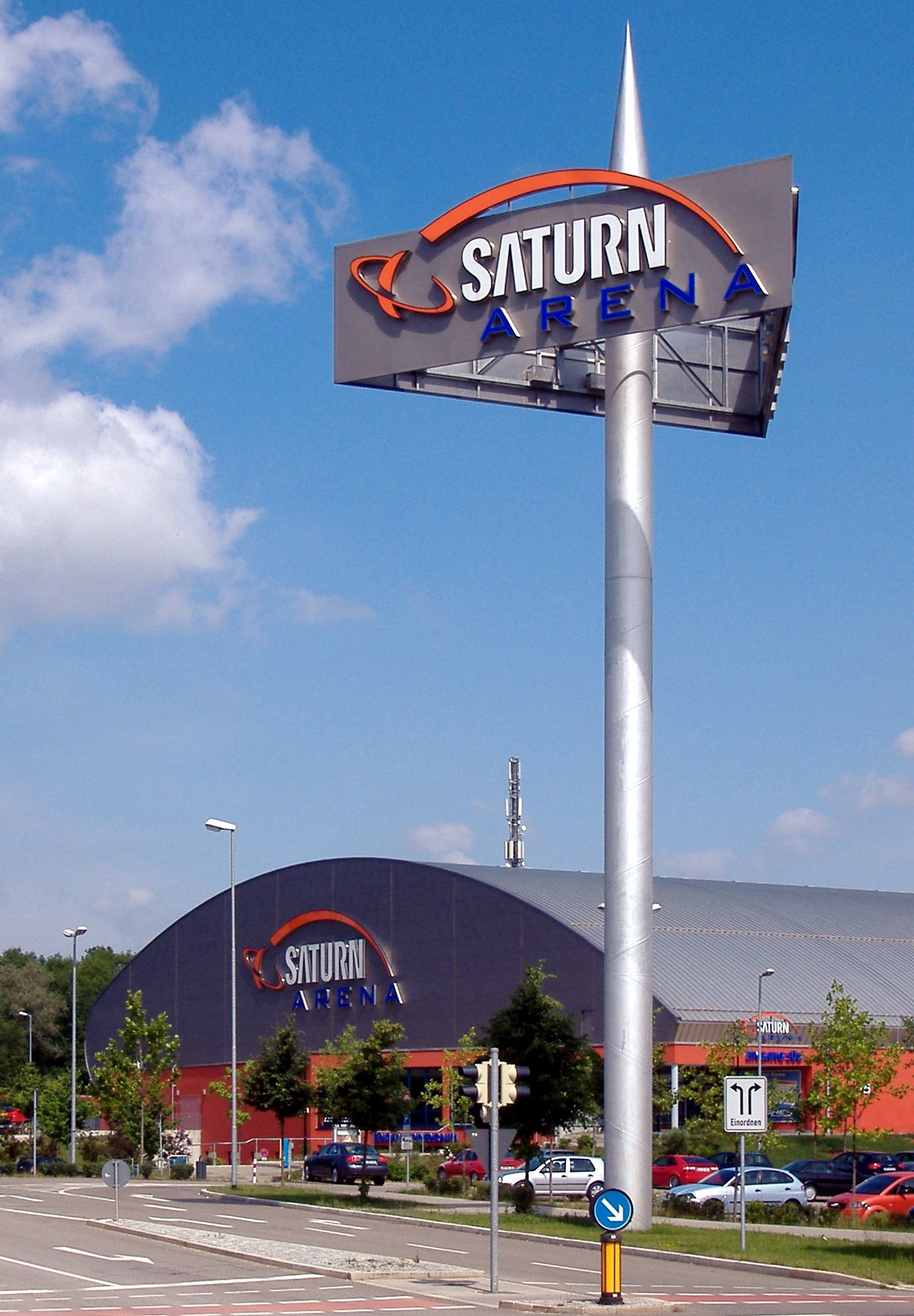
Saturn Arena Ingolstadt

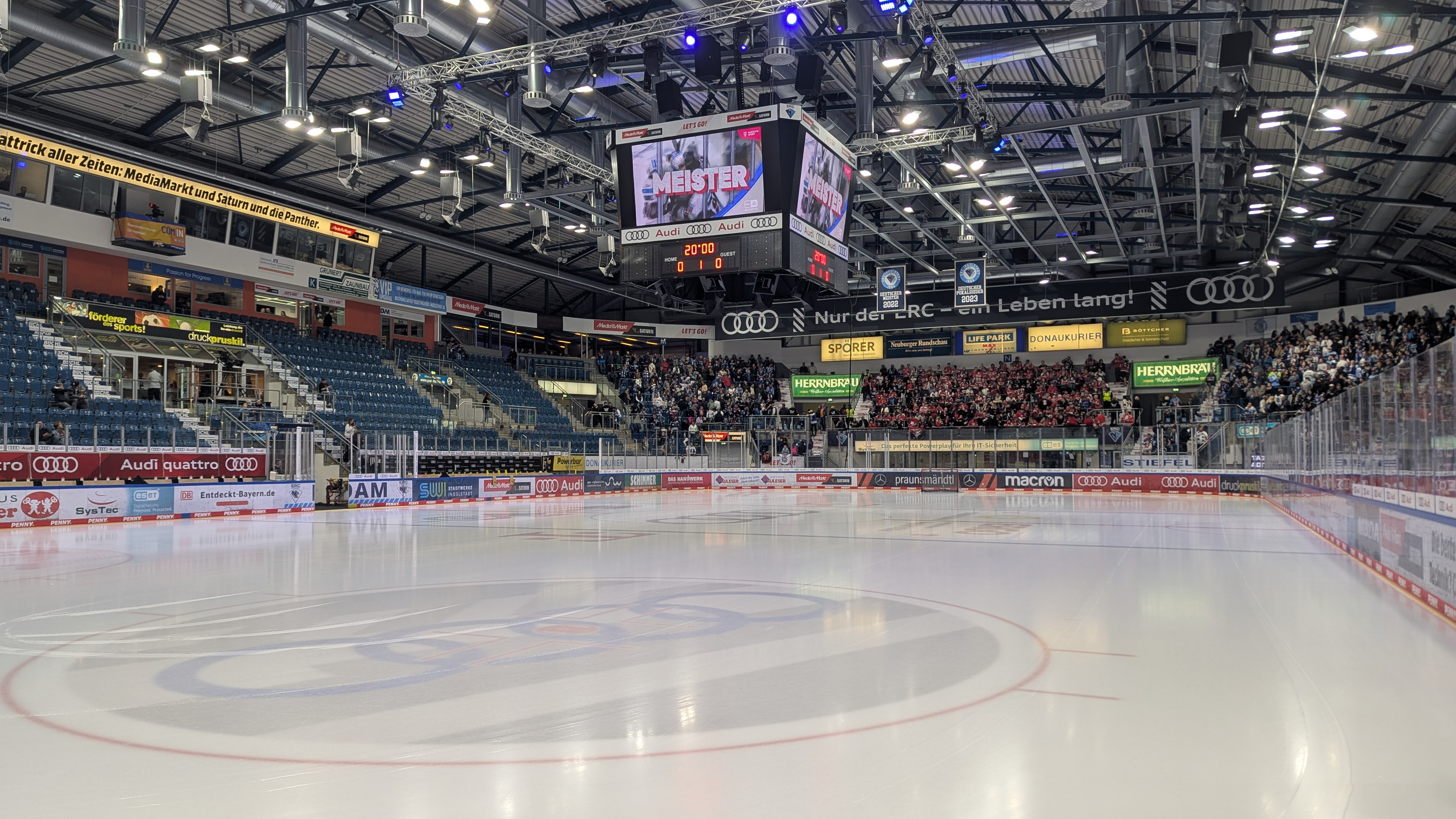
Interior

Saturn Arena (German pronunciation: [zatʊʁn aʁeːnaː]) is an arena in Ingolstadt, Germany. It is primarily used for the ice hockey club ERC Ingolstadt. Saturn Arena opened in 2003 and holds 4,815 people.
