= Färjestads Ishall =

Former indoor ice hockey rink in Karlstad, Sweden

Coordinates: 59°24′27″N 13°30′03″E

Färjestads ishall
- Interactive map of Färjestads ishall
- Location: Karlstad, Sweden
- Type: indoor ice hockey rink

Construction
- Opened: 4 November 1967
- Closed: April 2001

Färjestads Ishall was an arena in Karlstad, Sweden. It was the home arena for the ice hockey team Färjestads BK. It was inaugurated on 4 November 1967 with the Swedish top division game Färjestads BK–Djurgårdens IF., where Färjestads BK won, 8–4. For a long time it held 8,000 people during sport events, but the capacity was later reduced to 4,700 when seating became common standard. Löfbergs Lila Arena replaced it as the home of Färjestad.
