= 2017 IIHF Inline Hockey World Championship =

International sports tournament

Tournament details
- Host country: Slovakia
- Venue(s): Ondrej Nepela Arena, Bratislava
- Dates: 25 June – 1 July
- Teams: 8

Final positions
- Champions: United States (7th title)
- Runner-up: Finland
- Third place: Czech Republic
- Fourth place: Sweden

Tournament statistics
- Games played: 23
- Goals scored: 220 (9.57 per game)
- Attendance: 6,331 (275 per game)
- Scoring leader(s): (Finland) Teemu Lepaus (22 pts)

The 2017 IIHF Inline Hockey World Championship was the 20th and final IIHF Inline Hockey World Championship, an international inline hockey tournament run by the International Ice Hockey Federation. The World Championship runs alongside the 2017 IIHF Inline Hockey World Championship Division I tournament and took place between 25 June and 1 July 2017 in Bratislava, Slovakia at the Ondrej Nepela Arena. The tournament was won by the United States, earning their seventh World Championship title. Finland finished in second place and the Czech Republic in third after defeating Sweden in the bronze medal match.

== Qualification ==
Seven of the eight teams automatically qualified for the 2017 IIHF Inline Hockey World Championship while the eighth spot was awarded to the winner of the 2015 IIHF Inline Hockey World Championship Division I tournament. The 2015 Division I tournament was won by Croatia who defeated Australia in the final to earn promotion to the World Championship.

- Canada − Finished first in the 2015 World Championship
- Croatia − Winner of 2015 IIHF Inline Hockey World Championship Division I
- Czech Republic − Finished sixth in the 2015 World Championship
- Finland − Finished second in the 2015 World Championship
- Germany − Finished seventh in the 2015 World Championship
- Slovakia − Finished fourth in the 2015 World Championship
- Sweden − Finished third in the 2015 World Championship
- United States − Finished fifth in the 2015 World Championship

== Seeding and groups ==
The seeding in the preliminary round was based on the final standings at the 2015 IIHF Inline Hockey World Championship and 2015 IIHF Inline Hockey World Championship Division I. The World Championship groups are named Group A and Group B while the 2017 IIHF Inline Hockey World Championship Division I tournament use Group C and Group D, as both tournaments were held in Bratislava, Slovakia. The teams were grouped accordingly by seeding at the previous year's tournament (in parentheses is the corresponding seeding):

Group A

- Canada (1)
- Slovakia (4)
- United States (5)
- Croatia (8)

Group B

- Finland (2)
- Sweden (3)
- Czech Republic (6)
- Germany (7)

== Preliminary round ==
Eight participating teams were placed in the following two groups. After playing a round-robin, every team advanced to the Playoff round.

All times are local (UTC+2).

=== Group A ===
Team	Pld	W	OTW	OTL	L	GF	GA	GD	Pts
United States	3	3	0	0	0	24	5	+19	9
Slovakia	3	2	0	0	1	17	18	−1	6
Canada	3	1	0	0	2	16	18	−2	3
Croatia	3	0	0	0	3	5	21	−16	0

25 June 2017; 14:00	Canada	6 – 1 (3–0, 1–0, 0–1, 2–0)	Croatia	Ondrej Nepela Arena; Attendance: 248

Game reference
1.5 min	Penalties	18.5 min
27	Shots	11

25 June 2017; 18:00	Slovakia	1 – 8 (0–1, 0–4, 1–2, 0–1)	United States	Ondrej Nepela Arena; Attendance: 945

Game reference
7.5 min	Penalties	4.5 min
10	Shots	26

26 June 2017; 14:00	United States	8 – 2 (3–1, 1–0, 1–0, 3–1)	Canada	Ondrej Nepela Arena; Attendance: 217

Game reference
20.5 min	Penalties	12.0 min
20	Shots	22

26 June 2017; 18:00	Slovakia	7 – 2 (3–1, 2–0, 2–0, 0–1)	Croatia	Ondrej Nepela Arena; Attendance: 463

Game reference
7.5 min	Penalties	10.5 min
26	Shots	19

27 June 2017; 14:00	Croatia	2 – 8 (2–1, 0–2, 0–4, 0–1)	United States	Ondrej Nepela Arena; Attendance: 113

Game reference
6.0 min	Penalties	1.5 min
9	Shots	39

27 June 2017; 18:00	Canada	8 – 9 (1–2, 1–3, 4–3, 2–1)	Slovakia	Ondrej Nepela Arena; Attendance: 792

Game reference
1.5 min	Penalties	6.0 min
43	Shots	24

=== Group B ===
Team	Pld	W	OTW	OTL	L	GF	GA	GD	Pts
Finland	3	2	1	0	0	18	13	+5	8
Czech Republic	3	2	0	1	0	15	13	+2	7
Sweden	3	1	0	0	2	11	11	0	3
Germany	3	0	0	0	3	8	15	−7	0

25 June 2017; 16:00	Finland	5 – 2 (0–0, 1–1, 3–0, 1–1)	Germany	Ondrej Nepela Arena; Attendance: 213

Game reference
3.0 min	Penalties	3.0 min
22	Shots	13

25 June 2017; 20:00	Sweden	2 – 3 (0–0, 2–1, 0–1, 0–1)	Czech Republic	Ondrej Nepela Arena; Attendance: 291

Game reference
3.0 min	Penalties	4.5 min
10	Shots	21

26 June 2017; 16:00	Sweden	4 – 2 (1–0, 1–0, 2–1, 0–1)	Germany	Ondrej Nepela Arena; Attendance: 97

Game reference
3.0 min	Penalties	4.5 min
15	Shots	16

26 June 2017; 20:00	Czech Republic	6 – 7 (SO) (2–2, 0–1, 2–1, 2–2, 0–0, 0–1)	Finland	Ondrej Nepela Arena; Attendance: 173

Game reference
26.0 min	Penalties	6.0 min
27	Shots	21

27 June 2017; 16:00	Germany	4 – 6 (1–2, 1–0, 1–1, 1–3)	Czech Republic	Ondrej Nepela Arena; Attendance: 116

Game reference
7.5 min	Penalties	3.0 min
22	Shots	38

27 June 2017; 20:00	Finland	6 – 5 (1–2, 2–0, 2–0, 1–3)	Sweden	Ondrej Nepela Arena; Attendance: 203

Game reference
6.0 min	Penalties	0.0 min
21	Shots	14

== Playoff round ==
All eight teams advanced into the playoff round and were seeded into the quarterfinals according to their result in the preliminary round. The winning quarter finalists advanced through to the semifinals, while the losing teams moved through to the classification round. Slovakia defeated Croatia and Canada defeated Germany in the classification round to finish fifth and sixth respectively. Croatia and Germany moved on to the relegation game where Croatia was defeated 5–8 and was relegated back to Division I for 2019. In the semifinals the United States defeated the Czech Republic and Finland beat Sweden, both advancing to the gold medal game. After losing the semifinals the Czech Republic and Sweden played off for the bronze medal with the Czech Republic winning 5–2. The United States defeated Finland 4–2 in the gold medal game, earning their seventh World Championship title.

Quarterfinals
A1	United States	4
B4	Germany	1
B2	Czech Republic	8
A3	Canada	2
B1	Finland	11
A4	Croatia	2
A2	Slovakia	4
B3	Sweden	6

Semifinals
A1	United States	5
B2	Czech Republic	4
B1	Finland	6
B3	Sweden	5

Finals
A1	United States	4
B1	Finland	2
Bronze medal game
B2	Czech Republic	5
B3	Sweden	2

All times are local (UTC+2).

=== Quarterfinals ===
29 June 2017; 14:00	Czech Republic	8 – 2 (0–1, 3–1, 1–0, 4–0)	Canada	Ondrej Nepela Arena; Attendance: 123

Game reference
3.0 min	Penalties	9.0 min
32	Shots	17

29 June 2017; 16:00	Finland	11 – 1 (4–0, 3–1, 1–1, 3–0)	Croatia	Ondrej Nepela Arena; Attendance: 141

Game reference
1.5 min	Penalties	4.5 min
31	Shots	16

29 June 2017; 18:00	Slovakia	4 – 6 (0–1, 1–3, 3–0, 0–2)	Sweden	Ondrej Nepela Arena; Attendance: 817

Game reference
7.5 min	Penalties	4.5 min
28	Shots	24

29 June 2017; 20:00	United States	4 – 1 (0–0, 1–0, 1–0, 2–1)	Germany	Ondrej Nepela Arena; Attendance: 94

Game reference
7.5 min	Penalties	6.0 min
32	Shots	18

=== Classification ===
30 June 2017; 14:00	Canada	8 – 3 (1–0, 3–1, 2–2, 2–0)	Germany	Ondrej Nepela Arena; Attendance: 61

Game reference
7.5 min	Penalties	4.5 min
34	Shots	17

30 June 2017; 16:00	Slovakia	8 – 4 (2–1, 1–1, 2–0, 3–2)	Croatia	Ondrej Nepela Arena; Attendance: 129

Game reference
3.0 min	Penalties	7.5 min
25	Shots	18

=== Semifinals ===
30 June 2017; 18:00	United States	5 – 4 (1–2, 0–1, 2–1, 2–0)	Czech Republic	Ondrej Nepela Arena; Attendance: 221

Game reference
4.5 min	Penalties	6.0 min
26	Shots	17

30 June 2017; 20:00	Finland	6 – 5 (OT) (2–0, 1–2, 1–1, 1–2, 1–0)	Sweden	Ondrej Nepela Arena; Attendance: 152

Game reference
3.0 min	Penalties	3.0 min
25	Shots	30

=== Relegation game ===
1 July 2017; 11:00	Germany	8 – 5 (2–1, 4–2, 0–0, 2–2)	Croatia	Ondrej Nepela Arena; Attendance: 68

Game reference
3.0 min	Penalties	3.0 min
26	Shots	27

=== Bronze medal game ===
1 July 2017; 17:30	Czech Republic	5 – 2 (3–0, 0–1, 0–1, 2–0)	Sweden	Ondrej Nepela Arena; Attendance: 236

Game reference
4.5 min	Penalties	3.0 min
18	Shots	34

=== Gold medal game ===
1 July 2017; 20:00	United States	4 – 2 (1–0, 3–1, 0–1, 0–0)	Finland	Ondrej Nepela Arena; Attendance: 418

Game reference
6.0 min	Penalties	3.0 min
26	Shots	25

== Ranking and statistics ==
2017 IIHF Inline Hockey World Championship winners

United States
7th title

=== Tournament Awards ===
- Best players selected by the directorate:
  - Best Goalkeeper: (United States) Troy Redmann
  - Best Defenseman: (Finland) Petri Partanen
  - Best Forward: (United States) Matt White

=== Final standings ===
The final standings of the tournament according to IIHF:

Rk.	Team
1st place, gold medalist(s)	United States
2nd place, silver medalist(s)	Finland
3rd place, bronze medalist(s)	Czech Republic
4.	Sweden
5.	Slovakia
6.	Canada
7.	Germany
8.	Croatia

=== Scoring leaders ===
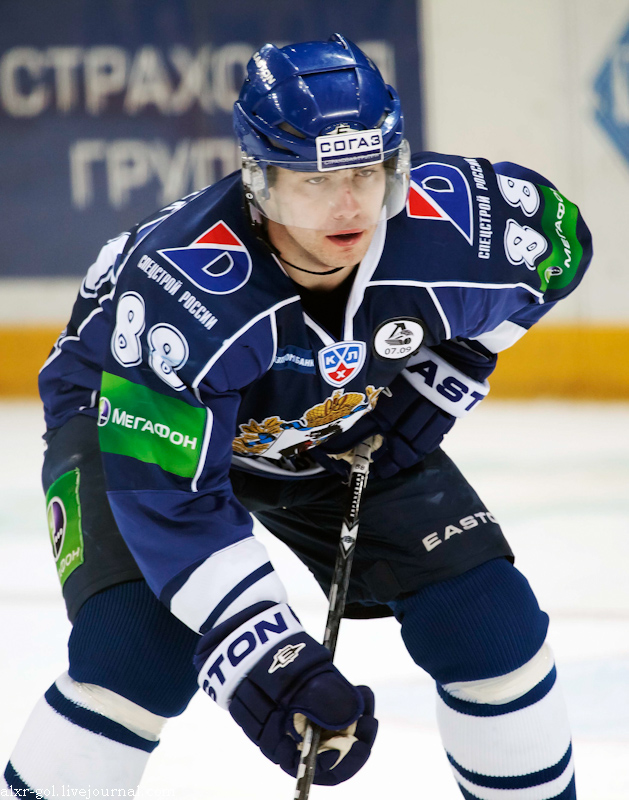
The Czech Republic's Jakub Petružálek scored five goals and eight assists in his six games

List shows the top skaters sorted by points, then goals. If the list exceeds 10 skaters because of a tie in points, all of the tied skaters are shown.

Player	GP	G	A	Pts	+/-	PIM	POS
(Finland) Teemu Lepaus	6	11	11	22	+8	1.5	F
(United States) Matt White	6	7	9	16	+11	3.0	F
(Finland) Eemeli Suomi	6	4	12	16	+8	1.5	F
(Sweden) Markus Kinisjarvi	6	5	9	14	+2	1.5	F
(Czech Republic) Jakub Petružálek	6	5	8	13	+5	3.0	F
(United States) Jack Combs	6	9	3	12	+10	6.0	F
(Sweden) Linus Svedlund	6	5	7	12	–1	3.0	F
(Czech Republic) Petr Kafka	5	5	6	11	+3	0.0	F
(Slovakia) Filip Novák	5	5	6	11	0	3.0	F
(Slovakia) Juraj Jurik	5	3	7	10	0	7.5	F
(Slovakia) Peter Lichanec	5	3	7	10	+3	0.0	F
(Slovakia) Jakub Ruckay	5	3	7	10	+1	4.5	D
(United States) Derrick Burnett	6	0	10	10	+11	14.5	D

=== Leading goaltenders ===
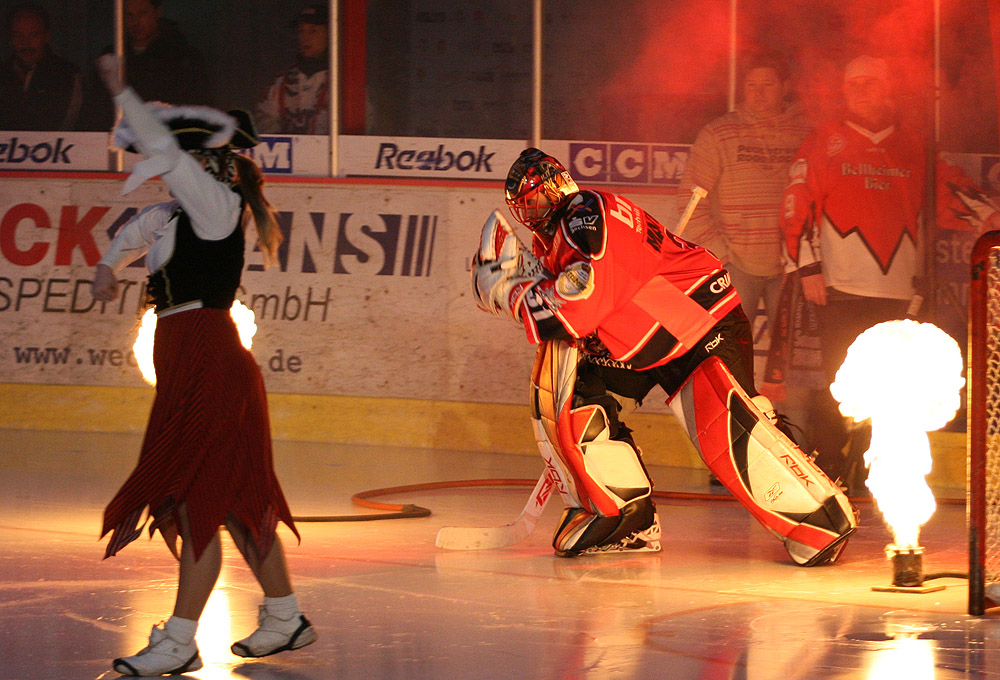
Germany's Siniša Martinović finished third among the goaltenders with a save percentage of 81.58

Only the top five goaltenders, based on save percentage, who have played at least 40% of their team's minutes are included in this list.

Player	MIP	SOG	GA	GAA	SVS%	SO
(United States) Troy Redmann	192:00	82	9	2.25	89.02	0
(Czech Republic) Dominik Frodl	244:54	108	18	3.53	83.33	0
(Germany) Siniša Martinović	199:51	114	21	5.04	81.58	0
(Sweden) Robert Kinisjarvi	285:50	128	25	4.20	80.47	0
(Slovakia) Vladimir Neumann	214:15	124	26	5.83	79.03	0
