= IIHF Inline Hockey World Championship =

International men's hockey, 1996–2017

- Sport: Inline hockey
- Founded: 1996
- Folded: 2017
- Last champion: United States (2017)
- Most titles: United States (7 titles)
- Website: IIHF.com

The IIHF Inline Hockey World Championships were an annual international men's inline hockey tournament organized by the International Ice Hockey Federation (IIHF). The first World Championship was held in 1996 in which eleven nations participated. In 2003, sixteen nations took part and were split into two divisions. The top eight teams played for the World Championship and the other eight played for the Division I title. The last format in use featured the World Championship, Division I and three regional qualification tournaments. The World Championship and Division I tournament were played on odd years and the qualification tournaments were played on even years. The United States was the tournament's most dominant team, winning the World Championship seven times. After 20 editions, the IIHF cancelled the tournament in June 2019.

== History ==
During the first three years of the IIHF Inline Hockey World Championship, North American teams dominated the field. The United States and Canada finished in first and second place at each of the first three championships, in which the United States played host to each year.

In 1998, the format of the tournament changed and so, for the first time, did the gold medalist. The tournament was expanded to include two groups, one with the top eight teams in Anaheim, California and the other group, with the next eight nations, hosted in Bratislava, Slovakia. Canada upset the two-time world champion and hosts, Team USA, for the gold medal. The 2000 World Championship was the first true shift in the standings to Europe’s advantage. Finland finally upgraded its bronze medal and went home with the gold after defeating the hosts, the Czech Republic, in the final game. Team USA closed out the medal winners with a bronze medal. The 2000 World Championship also featured New Zealand and Chile in the world championship mix for the first time. Overall, the 2000 tournament had teams from four continents (North America, South America, Europe and Australia) represented.

In 2001, Finland won the gold medal for the second straight year, edging out the host again, this time, Team USA. The Czech Republic took home a medal for the second straight year, earning the bronze medal and again four continents were represented. In 2002, Sweden emerged from out of nowhere to win its first-ever medal, which proved to be gold. The highest the Swedes had ever finished in the A Group was fifth and it was just Sweden’s third season in the top Group. That year, Germany gave the fans in Nurnberg something to cheer about, earning its first medal at the Inline Hockey World Championship, a bronze medal effort.

In 2003, it was Finland squeaking past Sweden in the final game, while Team USA returned to the podium, claiming the bronze medal. In 2010, USA won its fifth championship, first since 2006 and in 2012, Canada won its first championship since 1998. In July 2015 it was announced that the World Championships would be changed from an annual tournament to a biennial tournament. The change means that three qualification tournaments will be held in the even years to earn promotion to Division I, starting in 2016, and the World Championships will be held in the odd years, starting in 2017. The qualification tournaments have been restructured into three regions to lower travel costs with the regions now being Africa/South America, Asia/Oceania, and Europe/North America. In January 2016 the IIHF announced that two of the qualification tournaments had been realigned with North America moving into the Africa/South America tournament to become Americas/Africa, leaving Europe to have its own qualification tournament.

In June 2019 the IIHF announced that they would no longer govern inline hockey or organize the Inline Hockey World Championships. The IIHF had earlier cancelled the 2019 edition of the tournament due to a lack of applications for hosting the event.

== Format ==
The longest-lasting format for the World Championships featured 16 teams: 8 teams in the Top Division and 8 teams in Division I. If more than 16 teams wished to participate, qualification tournaments were held. In the preliminary round, the 16 teams were split into 4 groups (Groups A through D) with Groups A and B forming the Top Division, and the Groups C and D forming Division I. The teams play each other in a round robin format, and then all teams proceeded to the quarterfinals. Single-game elimination rounds were played to establish 1st through 8th place.

At the end of the tournament, the best seven teams of the Top Division and the winner of Division I qualified for the next IIHF Inline Hockey World Championship Top Division. The last-placed team of the Top Division was relegated to the next IIHF Inline Hockey World Championship Division I. Additionally, the bottom three placed teams in Division I were relegated to the Qualification tournaments, which were split into the three regions of Africa / South America, Asia / Oceania, and Europe / North America. The winners of the Qualification tournaments gained promotion to the next Division I tournament.

== Medal table ==
Countries in italics no longer compete at the World Championships.

Rank	Country	(gold) Gold	(silver) Silver	(bronze) Bronze	Medals
1	United States	7	4	4	15
2	Sweden	5	3	3	11
3	Finland	4	6	4	14
4	Canada	3	3	2	8
5	Czech Republic	1	2	2	5
6	Germany	0	1	4	5
7	Slovakia	0	1	0	1
8	Switzerland	0	0	1	1

== Divisions ==
The last format of the IIHF Inline Hockey World Championships involved the Top Division and Division I playing on odd years and three regional qualification tournaments playing on even years. The regional qualification tournaments were Americas/Africa, Asia/Oceania and Europe. For a full list of IIHF members, see List of members of the International Ice Hockey Federation.

=== Top Division and Division I ===
The Top Division comprised the top eight inline hockey nations in the world, split into Groups A and B. Division I comprised eight teams, split into Groups C and D.

Team	Appearances	Debut	Most recent	Best result
Argentina	12	1998	2017	12th (2001, 2015)
Australia	19	1996	2017	9th (2000)
Austria	19	1996	2015	4th (2007)
Belgium	2	2002	2004	15th (2002, 2004)
Brazil	13	2000	2017	8th (2001)
Bulgaria	4	2008	2015	16th (2008, 2012, 2013, 2015)
Canada	12	1996	2017	1st (1998, 2012, 2015)
Chile	2	2000	2002	14th (2000)
Chinese Taipei	2	2005	2009	15th (2009)
Croatia	8	2006	2017	8th (2017)
Czechoslovakia	2	1996	1997	5th (1997)
Czech Republic	18	1998	2017	1st (2011)
Finland	20	1996	2017	1st (2000, 2001, 2003, 2014)
Germany	20	1996	2017	2nd (2012)
Great Britain	16	1998	2017	8th (2012, 2014)
Hungary	17	2000	2017	9th (2001, 2002, 2005)
Italy	3	1996	1998	7th (1996, 1998)
Japan	15	1996	2014	9th (2003)
Latvia	3	2014	2017	10th (2017)
Namibia	3	2005	2007	13th (2006)
Netherlands	3	1997	2000	8th (2000)
New Zealand	10	2000	2017	10th (2007)
Portugal	1	2005	2005	15th (2005)
Russia	3	1996	1998	4th (1997)
Slovakia	18	2000	2017	2nd (2008)
Slovenia	15	2002	2017	4th (2012)
South Africa	4	2003	2011	16th (2003, 2007, 2009, 2011)
Sweden	18	1998	2017	1st (2002, 2005, 2007, 2008, 2009)
Switzerland	3	1996	1998	3rd (1997)
United States	20	1996	2017	1st (1996, 1997, 2004, 2006, 2010, 2013, 2017)

=== Qualification tournaments ===
The IIHF ran regional qualification tournaments in the year prior to the World Championship. The winner of each tournament qualified for a place in the Division I tournament. The last regional qualification tournaments to be used were Americas/Africa, Asia/Oceania and Europe.

Key:

- A: African Qualification tournament
- AO: Qualification Asia/Oceania tournament
- E: Qualification Europe tournament
- ROTW: Rest of the World Qualification tournament

Team	Appearances	Debut	Most recent	Best result
Argentina	2	2013 ROTW	2015 ROTW	1st (2013 ROTW, 2015 ROTW)
Austria	1	2016 E	2016 E	2nd (2016 E)
Belgium	1	2016 E	2016 E	6th (2016 E)
Brazil	1	2013 ROTW	2013 ROTW	2nd (2013 ROTW)
Bulgaria	5	2010 E	2016 E	1st (2012 E, 2013 E, 2015 E)
Chile	1	2015 ROTW	2015 ROTW	3rd (2015 ROTW)
Chinese Taipei	2	2012 ROTW	2016 AO	2nd (2012 ROTW)
Croatia	1	2010 E	2010 E	1st (2010 E)
Hong Kong	1	2015 ROTW	2015 ROTW	2nd (2015 ROTW)
India	1	2016 AO	2016 AO	4th (2016 AO)
Ireland	1	2014 E	2014 E	2nd (2014 E)
Israel	3	2010 E	2016 E	2nd (2015 E)
Japan	1	2016 AO	2016 AO	2nd (2016 AO)
Latvia	3	2013 E	2016 E	1st (2014 E, 2016 E)
Macedonia	5	2012 E	2016 E	3rd (2012 E, 2014 E)
Namibia	2	2009 A	2011 A	2nd (2009 A, 2011 A)
New Zealand	2	2012 ROTW	2016 AO	1st (2012 ROTW, 2016 AO)
Serbia	2	2015 E	2016 E	3rd (2015 E)
South Africa	3	2009 A	2012 ROTW	1st (2009 A, 2011A)
Turkey	4	2010 E	2016 E	2nd (2012 E)
