= 2015 IIHF Inline Hockey World Championship =

International sports tournament

Tournament details
- Host country: Finland
- Venue(s): 1 (in 1 host city)
- Dates: 5 July – 11 July
- Teams: 8

Final positions
- Champions: Canada (3rd title)
- Runner-up: Finland
- Third place: Sweden
- Fourth place: Slovakia

Tournament statistics
- Games played: 23
- Goals scored: 182 (7.91 per game)
- Attendance: 29,252 (1,272 per game)
- Scoring leader(s): (Finland) Jimi Palanto (19 Pts)

The 2015 IIHF Inline Hockey World Championship was the 19th IIHF Inline Hockey World Championship, an international inline hockey tournament run by the International Ice Hockey Federation. The World Championship runs alongside the 2015 IIHF Inline Hockey World Championship Division I tournament and took place between 5 and 11 July 2015 in Tampere, Finland. The tournament was won by Canada, earning their third World Championship title. Finland finished in second place and Sweden in third after defeating Slovakia in the bronze medal match. Slovenia, after losing the relegation game against Germany was relegated to Division I for 2017.

== Qualification ==
Seven of the eight teams automatically qualified for the 2015 IIHF Inline Hockey World Championship while the eighth spot was awarded to the winner of the 2014 IIHF Inline Hockey World Championship Division I tournament. The 2014 Division I tournament was won by Slovenia who defeated Australia in the final to earn promotion back to the World Championship after they were relegated in 2013.

- Canada − Finished second in the 2014 World Championship
- Czech Republic − Finished fifth in the 2014 World Championship
- Finland − Finished first in the 2014 World Championship
- Germany − Finished sixth in the 2014 World Championship
- Slovakia − Finished seventh in the 2014 World Championship
- Slovenia − Winner of 2014 IIHF Inline Hockey World Championship Division I
- Sweden − Finished fourth in the 2014 World Championship
- United States − Finished third in the 2014 World Championship

== Seeding and groups ==
The seeding in the preliminary round was based on the final standings at the 2014 IIHF Inline Hockey World Championship and 2014 IIHF Inline Hockey World Championship Division I tournaments. The World Championship groups are named Group A and Group B while the 2015 IIHF Inline Hockey World Championship Division I tournament uses Group C and Group D, as both tournaments were held in Tampere, Finland. The teams were grouped accordingly by seeding at the previous year's tournament (in parentheses is the corresponding seeding):

Group A

- Finland (1)
- Sweden (4)
- Czech Republic (5)
- Slovenia (8)

Group B

- Canada (2)
- United States (3)
- Germany (6)
- Slovakia (7)

== Preliminary round ==
Eight participating teams were placed in the following two groups. After playing a round-robin, every team advanced to the Playoff round.

All times are local (UTC+3).

=== Group A ===
Team	Pld	W	OTW	OTL	L	GF	GA	GD	Pts
Finland	3	3	0	0	0	25	6	+19	9
Czech Republic	3	2	0	0	1	11	13	−2	6
Sweden	3	1	0	0	2	9	17	−8	3
Slovenia	3	0	0	0	3	7	16	−9	0

5 July 2015; 14:00	Sweden	4 – 5 (3–0, 0–1, 1–2, 0–2)	Czech Republic	Hakametsa Arena; Attendance: 250

Game reference

5 July 2015; 18:00	Slovenia	2 – 9 (2–3, 0–3, 0–2, 0–1)	Finland	Hakametsa Arena; Attendance: 2058

Game reference

6 July 2015; 14:00	Sweden	4 – 3 (1–1, 2–1, 0–0, 1–1)	Slovenia	Hakametsa Arena; Attendance: 160

Game reference

6 July 2015; 18:00	Finland	7 – 3 (0–0, 5–1, 1–1, 1–1)	Czech Republic	Hakametsa Arena; Attendance: 2197

Game reference

7 July 2015; 14:00	Czech Republic	3 – 2 (1–0, 2–1, 0–0, 0–1)	Slovenia	Hakametsa Arena; Attendance: 210

Game reference

7 July 2015; 18:00	Finland	9 – 1 (2–0, 2–0, 1–0, 4–1)	Sweden	Hakametsa Arena; Attendance: 4414

Game reference

=== Group B ===
Team	Pld	W	OTW	OTL	L	GF	GA	GD	Pts
Canada	3	2	1	0	0	16	10	+6	8
United States	3	2	0	1	0	17	8	+9	7
Slovakia	3	0	1	0	2	4	12	−8	2
Germany	3	0	0	1	2	8	15	−7	1

5 July 2015; 16:00	United States	7 – 3 (2–0, 3–2, 1–0, 1–1)	Germany	Hakametsa Arena; Attendance: 350

Game reference

5 July 2015; 20:00	Slovakia	2 – 5 (1–0, 0–1, 0–2, 1–2)	Canada	Hakametsa Arena; Attendance: 270

Game reference

6 July 2015; 16:00	United States	6 – 0 (2–0, 3–0, 1–0, 0–0)	Slovakia	Hakametsa Arena; Attendance: 287

Game reference

6 July 2015; 20:00	Canada	6 – 4 (3–0, 2–1, 0–2, 1–1)	Germany	Hakametsa Arena; Attendance: 170

Game reference

7 July 2015; 16:00	Germany	1 – 2 (SO) (1–0, 0–1, 0–0, 0–0, 0–0, 0–1)	Slovakia	Hakametsa Arena; Attendance: 454

Game reference

7 July 2015; 20:00	Canada	5 – 4 (OT) (0–1, 3–2, 0–0, 1–1, 1–0)	United States	Hakametsa Arena; Attendance: 1750

Game reference

== Playoff round ==
All eight teams advanced into the playoff round and were seeded into the quarterfinals according to their result in the preliminary round. The winning quarter finalists advanced through to the semifinals, while the losing teams moved through to the placement round. Slovenia was relegated back to Division I after losing the relegation game against Germany, while the United States finished fifth after defeating Slovenia and the Czech Republic finished sixth following their win over Germany in their placement round games. In the semifinals Finland defeated Slovakia and Canada beat Sweden, both advancing to the gold medal game. After losing the semifinals Slovakia and Sweden played off for the bronze medal with Sweden winning 5–4. Canada defeated Finland 4–2 in the gold medal game, earning their third World Championship title.

Quarterfinals
A1	Finland	6
B4	Germany	3
A2	Czech Republic	3
B3	Slovakia	4
B1	Canada	6
A4	Slovenia	5
B2	United States	2
A3	Sweden	5

Semifinals
QF3	Finland	4
QF4	Slovakia	3
QF1	Canada	6
QF2	Sweden	2

Finals
SF1	Finland	2
SF2	Canada	4
Bronze medal game
SF1	Slovakia	4
SF2	Sweden	5

All times are local (UTC+3).

=== Quarterfinals ===
9 July 2015; 14:00	United States	2 – 5 (0–0, 1–3, 1–0, 0–2)	Sweden	Hakametsa Arena; Attendance: 340

Game reference

9 July 2015; 16:00	Czech Republic	3 – 4 (1–1, 1–1, 0–2, 1–0)	Slovakia	Hakametsa Arena; Attendance: 410

Game reference

9 July 2015; 18:00	Finland	6 – 3 (3–2, 2–0, 0–0, 1–1)	Germany	Hakametsa Arena; Attendance: 3168

Game reference

9 July 2015; 20:00	Canada	6 – 5 (0–3, 0–1, 5–0, 1–1)	Slovenia	Hakametsa Arena; Attendance: 368

Game reference

=== Classification round ===
10 July 2015; 14:00	Czech Republic	4 – 1 (0–0,1–0,0–1,3–0)	Germany	Hakametsa Arena; Attendance: 165

Game reference

10 July 2015; 16:00	United States	5 – 2 (2–1,1–0,1–0,1–1)	Slovenia	Hakametsa Arena; Attendance: 247

Game reference

=== Semifinals ===
10 July 2015; 18:00	Finland	4 – 3 (SO) (1–0,1–0,1–1,0–2,0-0,1-0)	Slovakia	Hakametsa Arena; Attendance: 2393

Game reference

10 July 2015; 20:00	Canada	6 – 2 (1–0,0–1,1–1,4–0)	Sweden	Hakametsa Arena; Attendance: 376

Game reference

=== Relegation game ===
11 July 2015; 11:00	Germany	5 – 4 (1–2, 1–0, 2–1, 1–1)	Slovenia	Hakametsa Arena; Attendance: 104

Game reference

=== Bronze medal game ===
11 July 2015; 17:30	Sweden	5 – 4 (0–1, 2–1, 2–1, 1–1)	Slovakia	Hakametsa Arena; Attendance: 2433

Game reference

=== Gold medal game ===
11 July 2015; 20:00	Finland	2 – 4 (1–1, 0–1, 0–0, 1–2)	Canada	Hakametsa Arena; Attendance: 6678

Game reference

== Ranking and statistics ==
2015 IIHF Inline Hockey World Championship winners

Canada
3rd title

=== Tournament Awards ===
- Best players selected by the directorate:
  - Best Goalkeeper: (Slovakia) Vladimir Neumann
  - Best Defenseman: (Canada) Adam Ross
  - Best Forward: (Finland) Jimi Palanto

=== Final standings ===
The final standings of the tournament according to IIHF:

Rk.	Team
1st place, gold medalist(s)	Canada
2nd place, silver medalist(s)	Finland
3rd place, bronze medalist(s)	Sweden
4.	Slovakia
5.	United States
6.	Czech Republic
7.	Germany
8.	Slovenia

=== Scoring leaders ===
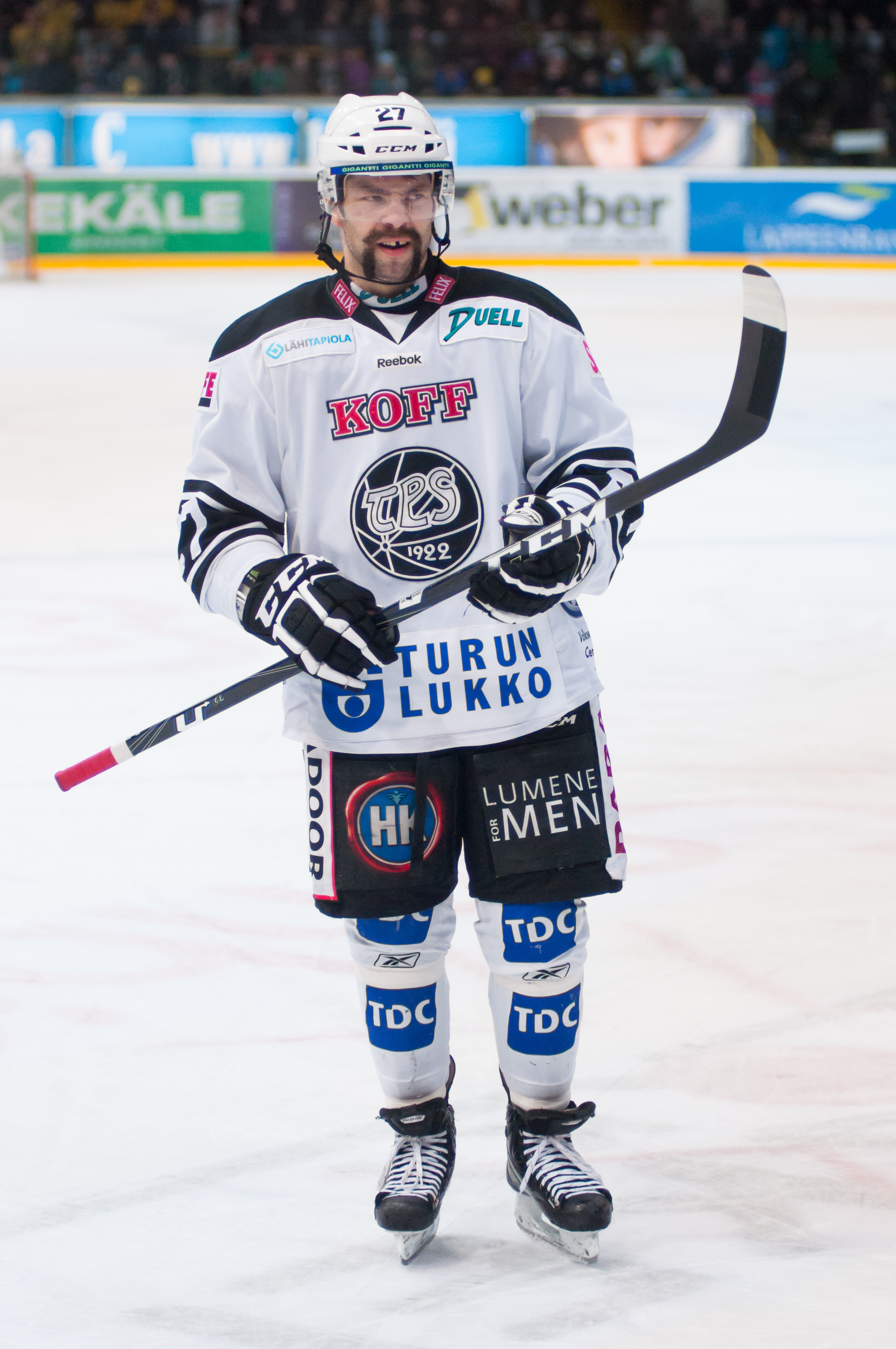
Finland's Marko Virtala scored four goals and six assists in his six games

List shows the top skaters sorted by points, then goals. If the list exceeds 10 skaters because of a tie in points, all of the tied skaters are shown.

Player	GP	G	A	Pts	+/-	PIM	POS
(Finland) Jimi Palanto	6	11	8	19	+13	3.0	F
(Canada) Dave Hammond	6	9	5	14	+3	1.5	F
(Canada) Adam Ross	6	6	7	13	+8	3.0	D
(Canada) Thomas Woods	6	4	8	12	+6	1.5	F
(Canada) Brett Bulmer	6	3	9	12	+7	0.0	F
(Finland) Sami Markkanen	6	2	10	12	+10	1.5	D
(United States) Travis Noe	5	5	5	10	0	3.0	F
(Finland) Marko Virtala	6	4	6	10	+5	0.0	F
(Slovenia) Rok Jakopic	6	3	7	10	+4	0.0	F
(Sweden) Emil Bejmo	6	3	6	9	+2	3.0	D
(Finland) Kristian Kuusela	6	2	7	9	+3	1.5	F

=== Leading goaltenders ===
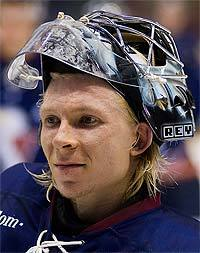
Sasu Hovi of Finland finished third among the goaltenders after finishing with a save percentage of 89.80

Only the top five goaltenders, based on save percentage, who have played at least 40% of their team's minutes are included in this list.

Player	MIP	SOG	GA	GAA	SVS%	SO
(Slovakia) Vladimir Neumann	271:53	223	18	2.38	91.93	0
(Germany) Jochen Vollmer	152:34	109	9	2.12	91.74	0
(Finland) Sasu Hovi	195:40	98	10	1.84	89.80	0
(Canada) Brett Leggat	291:04	159	19	2.35	88.05	0
(Slovenia) Tomaz Trelc	189:41	120	18	3.42	85.00	0
