= Jakub Petružálek =

Czech ice hockey player

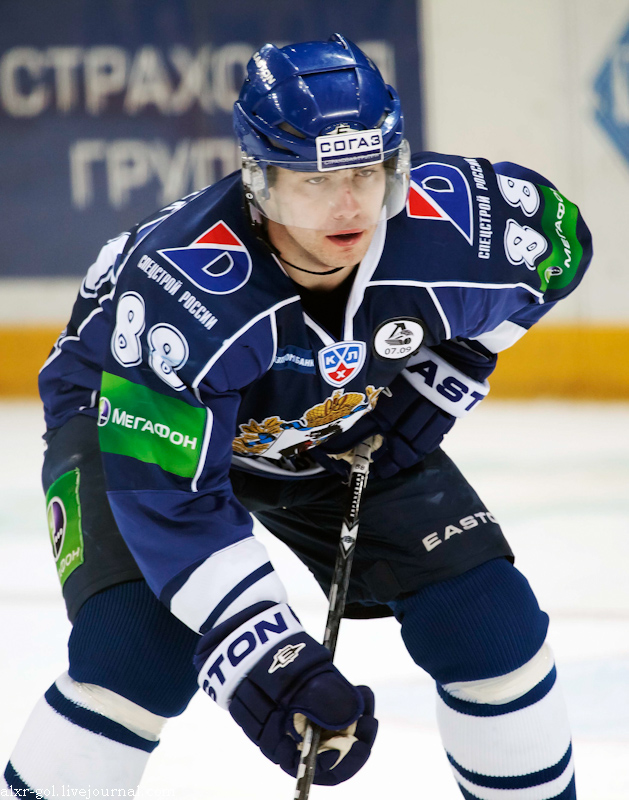
- Born: 24 April 1985 (age 41) Litvínov, Czechoslovakia
- Height: 5 ft 10 in (178 cm)
- Weight: 176 lb (80 kg; 12 st 8 lb)
- Position: Right wing
- Shot: Right
- Played for: HC Litvínov; Carolina Hurricanes; Lukko Rauma; Amur Khabarovsk; Dynamo Moscow; Ak Bars Kazan; Avtomobilist Yekaterinburg; Örebro HK; HC Oceláři Třinec
- National team: Czech Republic
- NHL draft: 266th overall, 2004; New York Rangers
- Playing career: 2005–2021

Jakub Petružálek (born 24 April 1985) is a Czech former professional ice hockey center who played in the National Hockey League (NHL) with the Carolina Hurricanes.

== Playing career ==
Petružálek played in his native Czech Republic with HC Litvínov of the Czech Extraliga, and in the Ontario Hockey League, before he was drafted by the New York Rangers, 266th overall in the 2004 NHL entry draft. He never played for the Rangers, who traded him to the Carolina Hurricanes along with a fifth-round conditional pick in the 2008 NHL entry draft (Tomáš Kubalík) for Brad Isbister.

On 15 May 2009, Jakub left the Hurricanes organization, having appeared in only 2 NHL games, and signed with Finnish club, Lukko Rauma, of the SM-liiga, for the 2009–10 season. Petružálek moved to Amur Khabarovsk of the Russian-based Kontinental Hockey League for the 2011–12 season.

On 28 May 2014, Petruzalek signed a one-year contract with his fourth KHL club, Avtomobilist Yekaterinburg, for the 2014–15 season. Petruzalek had registered 4 goals and 16 points in 23 games when, for reasons of bereavement, he was given an immediate release from his contract with Avtomobilist on 19 November 2014 in order to return to Litvínov, Czech Republic.

== Personal ==
While he was playing in Russia with Avtomobilist Yekaterinburg, Petruzalek's girlfriend of 5 years, fashion model and champion kickboxer Katerina Netolicka, was found dead in their apartment in Litvínov, Czech Republic on 12 November 2014. Petruzalek returned to the Czech Republic for the remainder of the season.

== Career statistics ==
=== Regular season and playoffs ===
			Regular season					Playoffs
Season	Team	League	GP	G	A	Pts	PIM	GP	G	A	Pts	PIM
2000–01	KLH Chomutov	CZE.2 U18	10	6	14	20	20	—	—	—	—	—
2000–01	HC Chemopetrol, a.s.	CZE U18	13	1	4	5	4	—	—	—	—	—
2001–02	HC Chemopetrol, a.s.	CZE U18	31	33	22	55	48	2	1	1	2	6
2002–03	HC Chemopetrol, a.s.	CZE U20	29	26	15	41	24	—	—	—	—	—
2002–03	HC Chemopetrol, a.s.	ELH	5	0	0	0	0	—	—	—	—	—
2003–04	HC Chemopetrol, a.s.	CZE U20	53	38	51	89	110	2	0	0	0	2
2003–04	HC Chemopetrol, a.s.	ELH	7	0	0	0	2	—	—	—	—	—
2003–04	SK HC Baník Most	CZE.3	1	0	0	0	0	—	—	—	—	—
2004–05	Ottawa 67's	OHL	59	23	40	63	64	21	8	10	18	30
2005–06	HC Chemopetrol, a.s.	CZE U20	3	4	2	6	4	—	—	—	—	—
2005–06	HC Chemopetrol, a.s.	ELH	19	1	1	2	6	—	—	—	—	—
2005–06	Barrie Colts	OHL	24	11	20	31	28	14	8	11	19	14
2006–07	Hartford Wolf Pack	AHL	6	0	2	2	0	—	—	—	—	—
2006–07	Charlotte Checkers	ECHL	7	1	9	10	4	—	—	—	—	—
2006–07	Albany River Rats	AHL	54	10	18	28	16	5	2	2	4	10
2007–08	Albany River Rats	AHL	78	14	31	45	52	7	2	1	3	8
2008–09	Albany River Rats	AHL	77	19	35	54	35	—	—	—	—	—
2008–09	Carolina Hurricanes	NHL	2	0	1	1	0	—	—	—	—	—
2009–10	Lukko	SM-liiga	55	17	24	41	78	4	0	1	1	4
2010–11	Lukko	SM-liiga	59	19	22	41	28	12	9	5	14	22
2011–12	Amur Khabarovsk	KHL	54	22	28	50	16	4	0	1	1	2
2012–13	Amur Khabarovsk	KHL	41	15	18	33	18	—	—	—	—	—
2012–13	Dynamo Moscow	KHL	10	0	2	2	4	19	9	7	16	4
2013–14	Amur Khabarovsk	KHL	38	13	7	20	26	—	—	—	—	—
2013–14	Ak Bars Kazan	KHL	13	1	2	3	0	3	0	0	0	0
2014–15	Avtomobilist Yekaterinburg	KHL	23	4	12	16	18	—	—	—	—	—
2014–15	HC Verva Litvínov	ELH	28	12	14	26	6	17	8	5	13	4
2015–16	Örebro HK	SHL	14	4	0	4	0	—	—	—	—	—
2015–16	Dynamo Moscow	KHL	4	1	0	1	2	—	—	—	—	—
2016–17	HC Oceláři Třinec	ELH	51	16	20	36	12	6	1	2	3	4
2017–18	HC Oceláři Třinec	ELH	19	5	5	10	2	18	4	3	7	4
2018–19	HC Verva Litvínov	ELH	52	8	21	29	40	—	—	—	—	—
2019–20	HC Verva Litvínov	ELH	43	9	23	32	14	—	—	—	—	—
2020–21	HC Verva Litvínov	ELH	15	0	2	2	0	—	—	—	—	—
ELH totals			239	51	86	137	82	41	13	10	23	12
NHL totals			2	0	1	1	0	—	—	—	—	—
KHL totals			183	56	69	125	84	26	9	8	17	6

Medal record

Representing Czech Republic

Ice hockey

World Championships
Bronze medal – third place	2012 Helsinki	

World Junior Championships
Bronze medal – third place	2005 North Dakota	

Inline hockey

World Championship
Bronze medal – third place	2017 Bratislava	

=== International ===
Year	Team	Event	Result	GP	G	A	Pts	PIM
2003	Czech Republic	WJC18	6th	6	1	0	1	0
2005	Czech Republic	WJC	3rd place, bronze medalist(s)	7	1	1	2	4
2012	Czech Republic	WC	3rd place, bronze medalist(s)	10	1	3	4	0
2014	Czech Republic	WC	4th	7	0	0	0	6
Junior totals				13	2	1	3	4
Senior totals				17	1	3	4	6
