= 2002 FIRS Men's Inline Hockey World Championships =

International sports tournament

FIRS World Championship VIII
Tournament details
- Host country: United States
- Venue: 1 (in 1 host city)
- Dates: July 25 - August 1
- Teams: 9

Final positions
- Champions: Canada (1st title)

Tournament statistics
- Scoring leader: (Canada) Hugo Belanger

The FIRS Men's World Inline Hockey Championship VIII was played between July 25 and August 1, 2002, in the American city of Rochester, New York. The venue was the ESL Sports Centre. The tournament was won by Canada which claimed its first ever gold medal. It was the eighth FIRS World Championship event, and was run by the International Roller Sports Federation (FIRS).

== Participating countries ==
Participating Teams
Rochester, New York - July 25 to August 1, 2002
Australia	Canada	Czech Republic
France	Israel	Japan
Mexico	Sweden	United States

== Rules ==
For standing purposes, points shall be awarded as follows:

- 2 points for a win in regulation or overtime
- 1 point for a tie in regulation or overtime
- No points for a loss in regulation or overtime

If a game is tied after regulation time in the round robin, the game ends in a tie. In the placement and medal rounds, a twelve-minute four-on-four sudden-death overtime session is played.

If teams are tied in a standing based on points, the following tie-breakers are applied: 1) The most points earned in direct games involving tied teams. 2) The best goal differential in direct games involving tied teams. 3) The most goal scored in direct games involving tied teams. 4) Follow steps 1, 2 and 3 with games involving the highest non-tied team in the same group. 5) Repeat step 4 with games involving the second highest non-tied team in the same group. 6) Continue this process with all non-tied team games.

== Preliminary round ==
After playing a round robin, the top four teams moved on to the Medal Rounds while the last five teams competed in the Placement Rounds.

Team	Pld	W	L	D	GF	GA	GD	Pts	Qualification
United States	8	7	0	1	78	10	+68	15	Advanced to the Medal Round
Canada	8	7	1	0	94	13	+81	14	Advanced to the Medal Round
Czech Republic	8	6	2	0	64	16	+48	12	Advanced to the Medal Round
France	8	5	2	1	54	15	+39	11	Advanced to the Medal Round
Mexico	8	3	5	0	24	50	−26	6	Sent to the Placement Round
Sweden	8	3	5	0	29	67	−38	6	Sent to the Placement Round
Australia	8	2	6	0	15	60	−45	4	Sent to the Placement Round
Japan	8	2	6	0	28	73	−45	4	Sent to the Placement Round
Israel	8	0	8	0	11	94	−83	0	Sent to the Placement Round

== Ranking and statistics ==
FIRS World Championship VIII winners

Canada
First title

=== Final standings ===
The final standings of the tournament according to FIRS:

Rk.	Team
1st place, gold medalist(s)	Canada
2nd place, silver medalist(s)	United States
3rd place, bronze medalist(s)	Czech Republic
4.	France
5.	Japan
6.	Sweden
7.	Mexico
8.	Australia
9.	Israel

== See also ==
- FIRS Inline Hockey World Championships
- List of FIRS Senior Men's Inline Hockey World Championships medalists
