= 2017 IIHF Inline Hockey World Championship Division I =

International sports tournament

Tournament details
- Host country: Slovakia
- Venues: 2 (in 1 host city)
- Dates: 25 June – 1 July
- Teams: 8

Tournament statistics
- Games played: 23
- Goals scored: 227 (9.87 per game)
- Attendance: 1,495 (65 per game)
- Scoring leader: (Slovenia) Jure Sotlar

The 2017 IIHF Inline Hockey World Championship Division I was an international inline hockey tournament run by the International Ice Hockey Federation. The Division I tournament ran alongside the 2017 IIHF Inline Hockey World Championship tournament and took place between 25 June and 1 July 2017 in Bratislava, Slovakia at the Ondrej Nepela Arena Rink 2 and Ondrej Nepela Arena. The tournament was won by Slovenia who upon winning gained promotion to the 2019 IIHF Inline Hockey World Championship. While New Zealand and Brazil were relegated to the Qualifications after losing their placement round games along with Hungary who lost the relegation game against Argentina.

== Qualification ==
Thirteen teams attempted to qualify for the three remaining spots in the 2017 IIHF Inline Hockey World Championship Division I tournament. The other five nations automatically qualified based on their results from the 2015 Championship and 2015 Division I tournament. Two qualification tournaments were held with a place awarded to the winner of each tournament. The Asia/Oceania Qualification tournament was contested between Chinese Taipei, India, Japan and New Zealand with New Zealand winning promotion and returning to Division I after being relegated in 2012. Malaysia and Singapore were initially announced to be competing in the tournament however later withdrew and were replaced by Chinese Taipei. The Europe Qualification tournament was contested between Austria, Belgium, Bulgaria, Israel, Latvia, Macedonia, Serbia and Turkey with Latvia winning promotion and returning to Division I after being relegated in 2015. Ireland was initially announced to be competed in the tournament however later withdrew. A third qualification tournament representing the regions of the Americas and Africa was originally planned however Brazil was the only registered participant and so gained automatic qualification to Division I.

- Argentina − Finished fourth in 2015 World Championship Division I
- Australia − Finished second in 2015 World Championship Division I
- Brazil − Americas/Africa qualifier
- Great Britain − Finished third in 2015 World Championship Division I
- Hungary − Finished fifth in 2015 World Championship Division I
- Latvia − Winner of the Europe Qualification tournament
- New Zealand − Winner of the Asia/Oceania Qualification tournament
- Slovenia − Relegated from the 2015 World Championship

=== Asia/Oceania Qualification ===
The 2016 IIHF Inline Hockey Qualification Asia/Oceania was held in New Plymouth, New Zealand from 21 to 23 April 2016. New Zealand gained promotion to Division I after winning their three games and finishing first in the standings. Japan finished in second place and Chinese Taipei in third.

Team	Pld	W	OTW	OTL	L	GF	GA	GD	Pts	Qualification
New Zealand	3	3	0	0	0	49	6	+43	9	Qualified for Division I
Japan	3	2	0	0	1	51	5	+46	6	
Chinese Taipei	3	1	0	0	2	29	13	+16	3	
India	3	0	0	0	3	0	105	−105	0	

All times are local.

21 April 2016; 17:30	Japan	6–0 (0–0, 2–0, 2–0, 2–0)	Chinese Taipei	New Plymouth

Game reference
6.0 min	Penalties	6.0 min

21 April 2016; 19:30	New Zealand	37–0 (8–0, 11–0, 9–0, 9–0)	India	New Plymouth

Game reference
1.5 min	Penalties	0.0 min

22 April 2016; 17:30	India	0–42 (0–12, 0–13, 0–9, 0–8)	Japan	New Plymouth

Game reference
7.5 min	Penalties	1.5 min

22 April 2016; 19:30	New Zealand	7–3 (2–0, 3–2, 1–0, 1–1)	Chinese Taipei	New Plymouth

Game reference
6.0 min	Penalties	6.0 min

23 April 2016; 17:30	Chinese Taipei	26–0 (1–0, 6–0, 8–0, 11–0)	India	New Plymouth

Game reference
4.5 min	Penalties	7.5 min

23 April 2016; 19:30	Japan	3–5 (1–1, 1–3, 0–1, 1–0)	New Zealand	New Plymouth

Game reference
1.5 min	Penalties	6.0 min

=== Europe Qualification ===
The 2016 IIHF Inline Hockey Qualification Europe was held in Steindorf, Austria from 22 to 25 June 2016. Latvia gained promotion after defeating Austria 4–2 in the final. Israel finished third place after defeating Macedonia in the 10–5 in the third place match.

==== Preliminary round ====
===== Group A =====
Team	Pld	W	OTW	OTL	L	GF	GA	GD	Pts
Austria	3	3	0	0	0	34	4	+30	9
North Macedonia	3	2	0	0	1	19	21	−2	6
Serbia	3	1	0	0	2	21	21	0	3
Bulgaria	3	0	0	0	3	9	37	−28	0

22 June 2016; 16:00	Bulgaria	5–11 (0–3, 3–4, 0–3, 2–1)	North Macedonia	Steindorf

Game reference
3.0 min	Penalties	4.5 min

22 June 2016; 20:00	Serbia	2–11 (1–3, 0–3, 0–3, 1–2)	Austria	Steindorf

Game reference
10.5 min	Penalties	4.5 min

23 June 2016; 16:00	Bulgaria	4–14 (2–3, 0–2, 1–2, 1–7)	Serbia	Steindorf

Game reference
6.0 min	Penalties	10.5 min

23 June 2016; 20:00	Austria	11–2 (0–0, 4–0, 5–0, 2–2)	North Macedonia	Steindorf

Game reference
3.0 min	Penalties	16.0 min

24 June 2016; 16:00	North Macedonia	6–5 (4–1, 0–0, 0–2, 2–2)	Serbia	Steindorf

Game reference
13.5 min	Penalties	35.0 min

24 June 2016; 20:00	Austria	12–0 (4–0, 2–0, 2–0, 4–0)	Bulgaria	Steindorf

Game reference
1.5 min	Penalties	1.5 min

===== Group B =====
Team	Pld	W	OTW	OTL	L	GF	GA	GD	Pts
Latvia	3	3	0	0	0	58	6	+52	9
Israel	3	2	0	0	1	20	23	−3	6
Belgium	3	1	0	0	2	28	22	+6	3
Turkey	3	0	0	0	3	5	60	−55	0

22 June 2016; 14:00	Belgium	6–7 (1–2, 2–3, 1–1, 2–1)	Israel	Steindorf

Game reference
3.0 min	Penalties	4.5 min

22 June 2016; 18:00	Turkey	1–30 (0–12, 0–2, 1–9, 0–7)	Latvia	Steindorf

Game reference
1.5 min	Penalties	0.0 min

23 June 2016; 14:00	Belgium	18–2 (2–0, 6–1, 4–1, 6–0)	Turkey	Steindorf

Game reference
4.5 min	Penalties	0.0 min

23 June 2016; 18:00	Latvia	15–1 (4–0, 5–0, 3–0, 3–1)	Israel	Steindorf

Game reference
6.0 min	Penalties	12.0 min

24 June 2016; 14:00	Israel	12–2 (3–0, 4–0, 2–1, 3–1)	Turkey	Steindorf

Game reference
6.0 min	Penalties	1.5 min

24 June 2016; 18:00	Latvia	13–4 (2–2, 6–0, 3–0, 2–2)	Belgium	Steindorf

Game reference
4.5 min	Penalties	18.0 min

==== Placement round ====
7th/8th game

25 June 2016; 14:00	Bulgaria	10–4 (2–2, 2–2, 4–0, 2–0)	Turkey	Steindorf

Game reference
3.0 min	Penalties	1.5 min

5th/6th game

25 June 2016; 16:00	Belgium	5–9 (2–1, 0–2, 3–2, 0–4)	Serbia	Steindorf

Game reference
7.5 min	Penalties	9.0 min

3rd/4th game

25 June 2016; 18:00	North Macedonia	5–10 (0–5, 1–2, 1–1, 3–2)	Israel	Steindorf

Game reference
13.5 min	Penalties	35.0 min

1st/2nd game

25 June 2016; 20:00	Latvia	4–2 (0–0, 1–1, 1–0, 2–1)	Austria	Steindorf

Game reference
7.5 min	Penalties	3.0 min

== Seeding and groups ==
The seeding in the preliminary round was based on the final standings at the 2015 IIHF Inline Hockey World Championship and 2015 IIHF Inline Hockey World Championship Division I, and the qualification tournaments. Division I's groups are named Group C and Group D while the 2017 IIHF Inline Hockey World Championship use Group A and Group B, as both tournaments are held in Bratislava, Slovakia. The teams were grouped accordingly by seeding at the previous year's tournament (in parentheses is the corresponding seeding):

Group C

- Slovenia (9)
- Argentina (12)
- Hungary (13)
- New Zealand (16)

Group D

- Australia (10)
- Great Britain (11)
- Latvia (14)
- Brazil (15)

== Preliminary round ==
Eight participating teams were placed in the following two groups. After playing a round-robin, every team advanced to the Playoff round.

All times are local (UTC+3).

=== Group C ===
Team	Pld	W	OTW	OTL	L	GF	GA	GD	Pts
Slovenia	3	3	0	0	0	29	5	+24	9
Hungary	3	2	0	0	1	14	12	+2	6
Argentina	3	1	0	0	2	10	19	−9	3
New Zealand	3	0	0	0	3	8	25	−17	0

25 June 2017; 13:00	Slovenia	12–1 (0–1, 2–0, 7–0, 3–0)	New Zealand	Ondrej Nepela Arena Rink 2 Attendance: 98

Game reference
1.5 min	Penalties	7.5 min
31	Shots	15

25 June 2017; 17:00	Argentina	1–6 (0–1, 0–2, 0–1, 1–2)	Hungary	Ondrej Nepela Arena Rink 2 Attendance: 107

Game reference
9.0 min	Penalties	10.5 min
13	Shots	16

26 June 2017; 13:00	Argentina	6–4 (1–3, 2–0, 1–0, 2–1)	New Zealand	Ondrej Nepela Arena Rink 2 Attendance: 88

Game reference
4.5 min	Penalties	3.0 min
25	Shots	19

26 June 2017; 17:00	Hungary	1–8 (0–0, 0–2, 0–3, 1–3)	Slovenia	Ondrej Nepela Arena Rink 2 Attendance: 120

Game reference
6.0 min	Penalties	3.0 min
20	Shots	44

27 June 2017; 13:00	New Zealand	3–7 (1–1, 1–2, 0–2, 1–2)	Hungary	Ondrej Nepela Arena Rink 2 Attendance: 64

Game reference
7.5 min	Penalties	7.5 min
25	Shots	19

27 June 2017; 17:00	Slovenia	9–3 (3–0, 0–1, 1–1, 5–1)	Argentina	Ondrej Nepela Arena Rink 2 Attendance: 72

Game reference
1.5 min	Penalties	3.0 min
33	Shots	22

=== Group D ===
Team	Pld	W	OTW	OTL	L	GF	GA	GD	Pts
Latvia	3	3	0	0	0	26	11	+15	9
Great Britain	3	2	0	0	1	15	10	+5	6
Australia	3	1	0	0	2	10	13	−3	3
Brazil	3	0	0	0	3	7	24	−17	0

25 June 2017; 15:00	Australia	7–0 (3–0, 1–0, 1–0, 2–0)	Brazil	Ondrej Nepela Arena Rink 2 Attendance: 67

Game reference
3.0 min	Penalties	4.5 min
14	Shots	10

25 June 2017; 19:00	Great Britain	4–7 (0–0, 1–3, 1–1, 2–3)	Latvia	Ondrej Nepela Arena Rink 2 Attendance: 110

Game reference
7.5 min	Penalties	0.0 min
11	Shots	23

26 June 2017; 15:00	Great Britain	4–2 (1–0, 1–1, 1–1, 1–0)	Brazil	Ondrej Nepela Arena Rink 2 Attendance: 46

Game reference
4.5 min	Penalties	1.5 min
26	Shots	21

26 June 2017; 19:00	Latvia	6–2 (1–1, 3–0, 0–1, 2–0)	Australia	Ondrej Nepela Arena Rink 2 Attendance: 40

Game reference
7.5 min	Penalties	15.0 min
29	Shots	23

27 June 2017; 15:00	Brazil	5–13 (1–2, 1–2, 1–3, 2–6)	Latvia	Ondrej Nepela Arena Rink 2 Attendance: 23

Game reference
7.5 min	Penalties	4.5 min
20	Shots	36

27 June 2017; 19:00	Australia	1–7 (0–3, 0–3, 0–0, 1–1)	Great Britain	Ondrej Nepela Arena Rink 2 Attendance: 20

Game reference
18.5 min	Penalties	14.5 min
29	Shots	32

== Playoff round ==
All eight teams advanced into the playoff round and were seeded into the quarterfinals according to their result in the preliminary round. The winning quarter finalists advanced through to the semifinals, while the losing teams moved through to the classification round. New Zealand and Brazil were relegated to the Qualifications after losing their classification round games and finished the tournament in seventh and eighth respectively. After winning their classification games Hungary and Argentina competed in the relegation game with Hungary being relegated to the Qualifications after losing 4–5 after a shootout. In the semifinals Slovenia defeated Great Britain and Latvia beat Australia, both advancing to the final. After losing the semifinals Great Britain and Australia played off for the bronze medal with Australia winning 7–3. Slovenia defeated Latvia 6–3 in the final and earned promotion to the 2019 IIHF Inline Hockey World Championship.

Quarterfinals
A1	Slovenia	14
B4	Brazil	4
B2	Great Britain	5
A3	Argentina	3
B1	Latvia	12
A4	New Zealand	4
A2	Hungary	2
B3	Australia	4

Semifinals
A1	Slovenia	7
B2	Great Britain	4
B1	Latvia	3
B3	Australia	1

Finals
SF1	Slovenia	6
SF2	Latvia	3
Bronze medal game
SF1	Great Britain	3
SF2	Australia	7

All times are local (UTC+2).

=== Quarterfinals ===
29 June 2017; 13:00	Great Britain	5–3 (1–0, 2–2, 0–0, 2–1)	Argentina	Ondrej Nepela Arena Rink 2 Attendance: 57

Game reference
12.0 min	Penalties	4.5 min
18	Shots	33

30 June 2017; 15:00	Hungary	2–4 (1–1, 0–1, 0–1, 1–1)	Australia	Ondrej Nepela Arena Rink 2 Attendance: 69

Game reference
10.5 min	Penalties	3.0 min
33	Shots	39

30 June 2017; 17:00	Latvia	12–4 (4–0, 1–1, 2–1, 5–2)	New Zealand	Ondrej Nepela Arena Rink 2 Attendance: 56

Game reference
4.5 min	Penalties	3.0 min
40	Shots	18

30 June 2017; 19:00	Slovenia	14–4 (3–2, 5–0, 2–1, 4–1)	Brazil	Ondrej Nepela Arena Rink 2 Attendance: 48

Game reference
6.0 min	Penalties	9.0 min
39	Shots	17

=== Classification ===
30 June 2017; 13:00	Argentina	5–4 (2–1, 1–2, 1–0, 1–1)	Brazil	Ondrej Nepela Arena Rink 2 Attendance: 51

Game reference
6.0 min	Penalties	4.5 min
28	Shots	16

30 June 2017; 15:00	Hungary	5–3 (1–1, 1–2, 0–0, 3–0)	New Zealand	Ondrej Nepela Arena Rink 2 Attendance: 74

Game reference
3.0 min	Penalties	3.0 min
23	Shots	27

=== Semifinals ===
30 June 2017; 17:00	Slovenia	7–4 (2–1, 2–2, 1–0, 2–1)	Great Britain	Ondrej Nepela Arena Rink 2 Attendance: 66

Game reference
6.0 min	Penalties	7.5 min
22	Shots	25

30 June 2017; 19:00	Latvia	3–1 (0–0, 1–0, 1–0, 1–1)	Australia	Ondrej Nepela Arena Rink 2 Attendance: 38

Game reference
13.0 min	Penalties	7.5 min
23	Shots	26

=== Relegation game ===
1 July 2017; 12:00	Hungary	4 – 5 (SO) (0–0, 2–0, 1–3, 1–1, 0–0, 0–1)	Argentina	Ondrej Nepela Arena Rink 2 Attendance: 66

Game reference
6.0 min	Penalties	4.5 min
17	Shots	33

=== Third place game ===
1 July 2017; 13:00	Great Britain	3–7 (2–3, 0–1, 1–2, 0–1)	Australia	Ondrej Nepela Arena; Attendance: 37

Game reference
7.5 min	Penalties	17.0 min
22	Shots	25

=== Final ===
1 July 2017; 15:00	Slovenia	6–3 (3–2, 1–1, 2–0, 0–0)	Latvia	Ondrej Nepela Arena; Attendance: 78

Game reference
4.5 min	Penalties	6.0 min
23	Shots	42

== Ranking and statistics ==
=== Standings ===
The final standings of the tournament according to IIHF:

Rk.	Team
1.	Slovenia
2.	Latvia
3.	Australia
4.	Great Britain
5.	Argentina
6.	Hungary
7.	New Zealand
8.	Brazil

=== Tournament Awards ===
- Best players selected by the directorate:
  - Best Goalkeeper: (Hungary) David Duschek
  - Best Defenseman: (Brazil) Luis Custodio
  - Best Forward: (Argentina) Owen Haiek

=== Scoring leaders ===
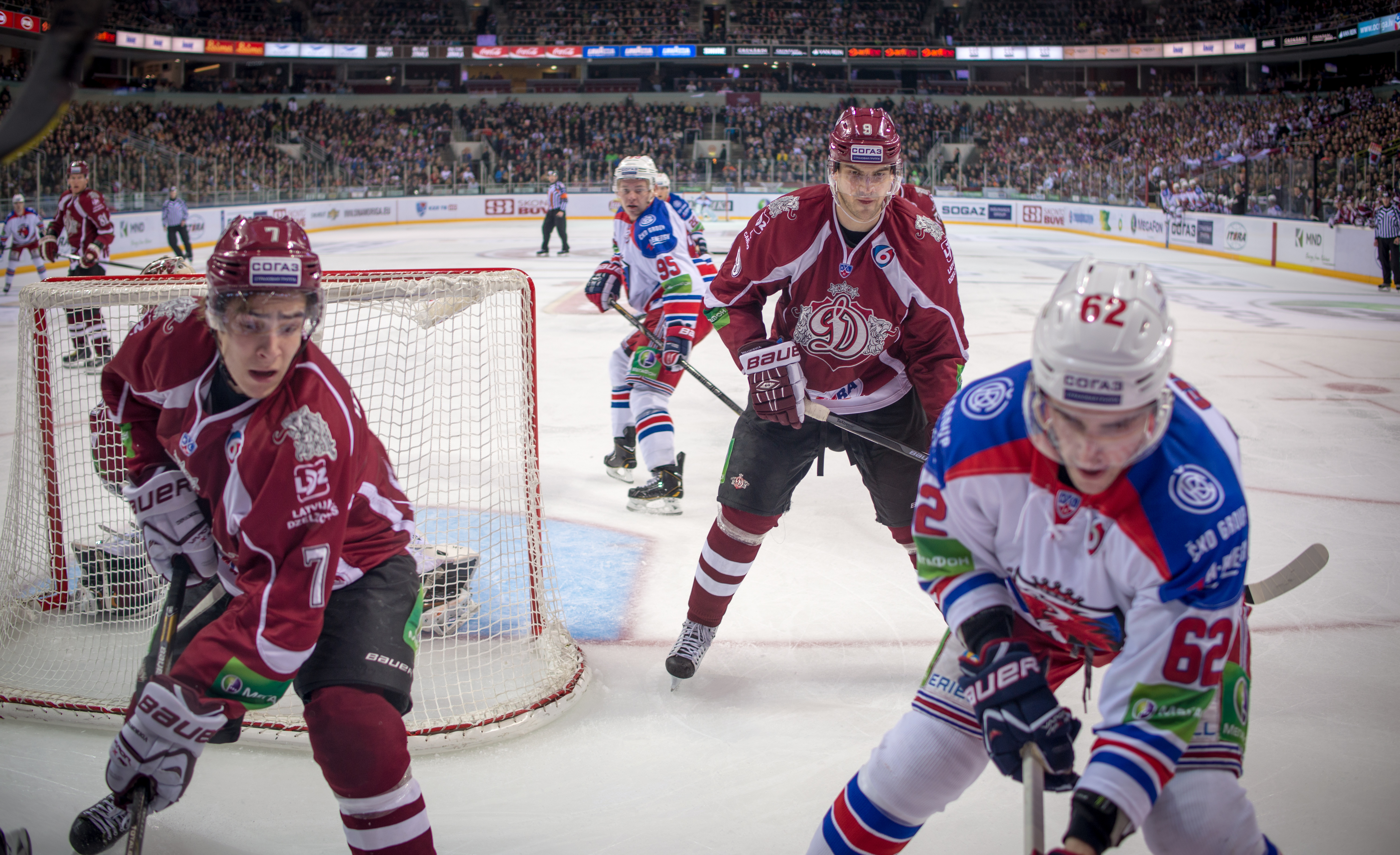
Latvia's Rustams Begovs scored twelve goals and five assists in his six games

List shows the top skaters sorted by points, then goals. If the list exceeds 10 skaters because of a tie in points, all of the tied skaters are shown.

Player	GP	G	A	Pts	+/-	PIM	POS
(Slovenia) Jure Sotlar	6	8	16	24	+19	0.0	F
(Slovenia) Gregor Koblar	6	8	11	19	+15	3.0	F
(Slovenia) Miha Logar	6	4	14	18	+15	0.0	D
(Latvia) Rustams Begovs	6	12	5	17	+12	4.5	F
(Slovenia) Mateuz Erman	6	9	6	15	+20	3.0	D
(Latvia) Aleksandrs Galkins	6	5	10	15	+9	3.0	D
(Slovenia) Ales Fajdiga	6	10	3	13	+9	4.5	F
(Latvia) Gatis Sprukts	6	6	7	13	+12	0.0	D
(Hungary) Ákos Kiss	6	5	7	12	+4	3.0	F
(Latvia) Rudolfs Maslovskis	6	5	7	12	+11	13.0	F
(Slovenia) Saso Rajsar	6	4	8	12	+9	3.0	F
(Latvia) Olafs Aploks	6	3	9	12	+12	0.0	F

=== Leading goaltenders ===
Only the top five goaltenders, based on save percentage, who have played at least 40% of their team's minutes are included in this list.

Player	MIP	SOG	GA	GAA	SVS%	SO
(Slovenia) Tomaz Trelc	168:00	94	10	2.85	89.36	0
(Hungary) David Duschek	255:21	155	18	3.39	88.39	0
(Latvia) Kristaps Kruze	171:46	76	9	2.52	88.16	0
(Australia) Michael James	268:45	132	16	2.85	87.88	1
(United Kingdom) Miles Finney	178:11	95	18	4.85	81.05	0
