= 2015 IIHF Inline Hockey World Championship Division I =

International sports tournament

Tournament details
- Host country: Finland
- Venues: 2 (in 1 host city)
- Dates: 6–11 July 2015
- Teams: 8

Tournament statistics
- Games played: 23
- Goals scored: 241 (10.48 per game)
- Attendance: 3,440 (150 per game)
- Scoring leader: (Croatia) Ivan Jankovic

The 2015 IIHF Inline Hockey World Championship Division I was an international inline hockey tournament run by the International Ice Hockey Federation. The Division I tournament ran alongside the 2015 IIHF Inline Hockey World Championship and took place between 5 and 11 July 2015 in Tampere, Finland. The tournament was won by Croatia who upon winning gained promotion to the 2017 IIHF Inline Hockey World Championship. While Austria and Bulgaria were relegated to the European Qualification after losing their placement round games along with Latvia who lost the relegation game against Hungary.

== Qualification ==
Seven teams attempted to qualify for the two remaining spots in the 2015 IIHF Inline Hockey World Championship Division I tournament. The other six nations automatically qualified after their results from the 2014 Championship and the 2014 Division I tournaments. Two qualification tournaments were held with a place awarded to the winner of each tournament. The European Qualification tournament was contested between Bulgaria, Israel, Macedonia and Serbia, with Bulgaria winning promotion and returning to Division I after being relegated in 2013. The Rest of the World Qualification tournament was contested between Argentina, Chile and Hong Kong, with Argentina winning promotion after also being relegated in 2013.

- Argentina − Winner of the Rest of the World Qualification
- Australia − Finished second in 2014 World Championship Division I
- Austria − Finished fifth in 2014 World Championship Division I
- Bulgaria − Winner of the European Qualification
- Croatia − Finished third in 2014 World Championship Division I
- Great Britain − Relegated from the 2014 World Championship
- Hungary − Finished sixth in 2014 World Championship Division I
- Latvia − Finished fourth in 2014 World Championship Division I

=== European Qualification ===
The European Qualification tournament was held at the Winter Sports Palace in Sofia, Bulgaria from 4 July to 6 July 2014. Bulgaria gained promotion to Division I after winning their three games and finishing first in the standings. Israel finished in second place and Serbia in third.

Team	Pld	W	OTW	OTL	L	GF	GA	GD	Pts	Qualification
Bulgaria	3	2	1	0	0	18	7	+11	8	Qualified for Division I
Israel	3	2	0	0	1	25	22	+3	6	
Serbia	3	1	0	1	1	27	18	+9	4	
North Macedonia	3	0	0	0	3	13	36	−23	0	

All times are local.

4 July 2014; 17:00	Israel	10 – 8 (1–1, 4–1, 0–5, 5–1)	Serbia	Winter Sports Palace

Game reference

4 July 2014	Bulgaria	6 – 3 (2–0, 1–0, 1–1, 2–2)	North Macedonia	Winter Sports Palace

Game reference

5 July 2014	Israel	14 – 6 (5–3, 2–1, 1–2, 6–0)	North Macedonia	Winter Sports Palace

Game reference

5 July 2014	Serbia	3 – 4 (OT) (2–0, 0–0, 1–2, 0–1, 0–1)	Bulgaria	Winter Sports Palace

Game reference

6 July 2014	North Macedonia	4 – 16 (2–4, 1–3, 0–4, 1–5)	Serbia	Winter Sports Palace

Game reference

6 July 2014	Bulgaria	8 – 1 (0–0, 1–0, 3–0, 4–1)	Israel	Winter Sports Palace

Game reference

=== Rest of the World Qualification ===
The Rest of the World Qualification tournament was held at the Peru Beach Hockey Arena in Buenos Aires, Argentina from 19 November to 21 November 2014. Argentina gained promotion to Division I after winning both of their games and finishing first in the standings. Hong Kong finished in second place after winning their game against Chile.

Team	Pld	W	OTW	OTL	L	GF	GA	GD	Pts	Qualification
Argentina	2	2	0	0	0	12	2	+10	6	Qualified for Division I
Hong Kong	2	1	0	0	1	11	7	+4	3	
Chile	2	0	0	0	2	2	16	−14	0	

All times are local.

19 November 2014; 21:00	Chile	2 – 9 (1–2, 1–4, 0–3, 0–0)	Hong Kong	Peru Beach Hockey Arena

Game reference

20 November 2014; 21:00	Hong Kong	2 – 5 (0–3, 2–0, 0–1, 0–1)	Argentina	Peru Beach Hockey Arena

Game reference

21 November 2014; 21:00	Argentina	7 – 0 (2–0, 2–0, 1–0, 2–0)	Chile	Peru Beach Hockey Arena

Game reference

== Seeding and groups ==
The seeding in the preliminary round was based on the final standings at the 2014 IIHF Inline Hockey World Championship and 2014 IIHF Inline Hockey World Championship Division I. Division I's groups are named Group C and Group D while the 2015 IIHF Inline Hockey World Championship use Group A and Group B, as both tournaments are held in Tampere, Finland. The teams were grouped accordingly by seeding at the previous year's tournament (in parentheses is the corresponding seeding):

Group C

- Great Britain (9)
- Latvia (12)
- Austria (13)
- Bulgaria (16)

Group D

- Australia (10)
- Croatia (11)
- Hungary (14)
- Argentina (15)

== Preliminary round ==
Eight participating teams were placed in the following two groups. After playing a round-robin, every team advanced to the Playoff round.

All times are local (UTC+3).

=== Group C ===
Team	Pld	W	OTW	OTL	L	GF	GA	GD	Pts
Latvia	3	3	0	0	0	36	6	+30	9
Great Britain	3	2	0	0	1	26	11	+15	6
Austria	3	1	0	0	2	12	17	−5	3
Bulgaria	3	0	0	0	3	2	42	−40	0

5 July 2015; 13:00	Latvia	12 – 0 (3–0, 1–0, 3–0, 5–0)	Austria	Hakametsa Rink 2 Attendance: 90

Game reference

5 July 2015; 17:00	Bulgaria	1 – 16 (1–0, 0–7, 0–5, 0–4)	Great Britain	Hakametsa Rink 2 Attendance: 127

Game reference

6 July 2015; 13:00	Latvia	18 – 1 (5–0, 6–0, 5–0, 2–1)	Bulgaria	Hakametsa Rink 2 Attendance: 124

Game reference

6 July 2015; 17:00	Great Britain	5 – 4 (0–1, 2–3, 2–0, 1–0)	Austria	Hakametsa Rink 2 Attendance: 252

Game reference

7 July 2015; 13:00	Austria	8 – 0 (1–0, 2–0, 3–0, 2–0)	Bulgaria	Hakametsa Rink 2 Attendance: 138

Game reference

7 July 2015; 17:00	Great Britain	5 – 6 (2–4, 1–1, 1–1, 1–0)	Latvia	Hakametsa Rink 2 Attendance: 106

Game reference

=== Group D ===
Team	Pld	W	OTW	OTL	L	GF	GA	GD	Pts
Croatia	3	2	0	0	1	17	9	+8	6
Australia	3	2	0	0	1	17	14	+3	6
Hungary	3	1	0	1	1	10	12	−2	4
Argentina	3	0	1	0	2	7	16	−9	2

5 July 2015; 15:00	Croatia	1 – 5 (1–0, 0–2, 0–2, 0–1)	Hungary	Hakametsa Rink 2 Attendance: 38

Game reference

5 July 2015; 19:00	Argentina	3 – 6 (1–2, 0–1, 1–1, 1–2)	Australia	Hakametsa Rink 2 Attendance: 300

Game reference

6 July 2015; 15:00	Croatia	7 – 0 (0–0, 1–0, 4–0, 2–0)	Argentina	Hakametsa Rink 2 Attendance: 179

Game reference

6 July 2015; 19:00	Australia	7 – 2 (0–0, 3–1, 0–0, 4–1)	Hungary	Hakametsa Rink 2 Attendance: 183

Game reference

7 July 2015; 15:00	Hungary	3 – 4 (OT) (2–0, 1–1, 0–1, 0–1, 0–1)	Argentina	Hakametsa Rink 2 Attendance: 130

Game reference

7 July 2015; 19:00	Australia	4 – 9 (0–2, 1–3, 1–1, 2–3)	Croatia	Hakametsa Rink 2 Attendance: 223

Game reference

== Playoff round ==
All eight teams advanced into the playoff round and were seeded into the quarterfinals according to their result in the preliminary round. The winning quarter finalists advanced through to the semifinals, while the losing teams moved through to the placement round. Austria and Bulgaria were relegated to the European Qualification after losing their placement round games and finished the tournament in seventh and eighth respectively. After winning their placement round games Latvia and Hungary competed in the relegation game with Latvia being relegated to the European Qualification after losing 3–4. The number of teams relegated to the Qualification tournaments was increased from two to three due to a change in format by the IIHF. The change means that three qualification tournaments will be held in the even years, starting in 2016, and the World Championships will be held in the odd years, starting in 2017. The qualification tournaments have been restructured into three regions to lower travel costs with the regions now being Africa / South America, Asia / Oceania, and Europe / North America. In the semifinals Australia defeated Great Britain and Croatia beat Argentina, both advancing to the final. After losing the semifinals Great Britain and Argentina played off for the bronze medal with Great Britain winning 3–2. Croatia defeated Australia 5–4 in overtime in the final and earned promotion to the 2017 IIHF Inline Hockey World Championship.

Quarterfinals
D2	Australia	6
C3	Austria	3
C2	Great Britain	7
D3	Hungary	5
D1	Croatia	23
C4	Bulgaria	0
C1	Latvia	4
D4	Argentina	5

Semifinals
QF1	Australia	7
QF2	Great Britain	4
QF3	Croatia	7
QF4	Argentina	0

Finals
SF1	Australia	4
SF2	Croatia	5
Bronze medal game
SF1	Great Britain	3
SF2	Argentina	2

All times are local (UTC+3).

=== Quarterfinals ===
9 July 2015; 13:00	Australia	6 – 3 (2–0, 0–2, 2–1, 2–0)	Austria	Hakametsa Rink 2 Attendance: 103

Game reference

9 July 2015; 15:00	Great Britain	7 – 5 (0–0, 3–1, 2–0, 2–4)	Hungary	Hakametsa Rink 2 Attendance: 119

Game reference

9 July 2015; 17:00	Croatia	23 – 0 (6–0, 4–0, 7–0, 6–0)	Bulgaria	Hakametsa Rink 2 Attendance: 82

Game reference

9 July 2015; 19:00	Latvia	4 – 5 (0–1, 1–0, 1–4, 2–0)	Argentina	Hakametsa Rink 2 Attendance: 215

Game reference

=== Placement round ===
10 July 2015; 13:00	Hungary	7 – 1 (1–1,2–0,0–0,4–0)	Austria	Hakametsa Rink 2 Attendance: 68

Game reference

10 July 2015; 15:00	Latvia	14 – 0 (2–0,1–0,4–0,7–0)	Bulgaria	Hakametsa Rink 2 Attendance: 127

Game reference

=== Semifinals ===
10 July 2015; 17:00	Great Britain	4 – 7 (2–0, 2–3, 0–2, 0–2)	Australia	Hakametsa Rink 2 Attendance: 101

Game reference

10 July 2015; 19:00	Croatia	7 – 0 (1–0, 2–0, 2–0, 2–0)	Argentina	Hakametsa Rink 2 Attendance: 154

Game reference

=== Relegation game ===
11 July 2015; 12:00	Latvia	3 – 4 (0–2, 1–0, 1–0, 1–2)	Hungary	Hakametsa Rink 2 Attendance: 73

Game reference

=== Third place game ===
11 July 2015; 13:00	Great Britain	3 – 2 (1–0, 1–1, 1–0, 0–1)	Argentina	Hakametsa Arena; Attendance: 191

Game reference

=== Final ===
11 July 2015; 15:00	Croatia	5 – 4 (OT) (1–1, 0–1, 3–1, 0–1, 1–0)	Australia	Hakametsa Arena; Attendance: 317

Game reference

== Ranking and statistics ==
=== Standings ===
The final standings of the tournament according to IIHF:

Rk.	Team
1.	Croatia
2.	Australia
3.	Great Britain
4.	Argentina
5.	Hungary
6.	Latvia
7.	Austria
8.	Bulgaria

=== Tournament Awards ===
- Best players selected by the directorate:
  - Best Goalkeeper: (Croatia) Mate Tomljenovic
  - Best Defenseman: (Australia) Cameron Todd
  - Best Forward: (Croatia) Ivan Jankovic

=== Scoring leaders ===
List shows the top skaters sorted by points, then goals. If the list exceeds 10 skaters because of a tie in points, all of the tied skaters are shown.

Player	GP	G	A	Pts	+/-	PIM	POS
(Croatia) Ivan Jankovic	6	12	13	25	+21	1.5	F
(Croatia) Igor Jacmenjak	6	5	16	21	+17	9.0	F
(Latvia) Roberts Lipsbergs	6	7	11	18	+10	6.0	D
(Latvia) Aleksandrs Galkins	6	6	12	18	+19	1.5	D
(Croatia) Domen Vedlin	6	5	12	17	+16	1.5	D
(Latvia) Miks Lipsbergs	6	7	9	16	+10	3.0	F
(United Kingdom) Nathan Finney	6	3	11	14	+10	1.5	D
(Latvia) Aleksandrs Kercs	6	9	4	13	+13	1.5	F
(United Kingdom) Sam Jones	6	6	7	13	+10	7.5	F
(Latvia) Rudolfs Maslovskis	6	6	7	13	+15	0.0	D
(Latvia) Rustams Begovs	6	2	11	13	+13	3.0	F

=== Leading goaltenders ===
Only the top five goaltenders, based on save percentage, who have played at least 40% of their team's minutes are included in this list.

Player	MIP	SOG	GA	GAA	SVS%	SO
(Hungary) Tamas Kiss	143:28	76	7	1.76	90.79	0
(Croatia) Mate Tomljenovic	192:08	76	8	1.50	89.47	2
(Latvia) Kristaps Kruze	201:52	70	9	1.61	87.14	2
(Austria) Patrick Machreich	204:16	159	23	4.05	85.53	0
(Argentina) Lucas Marcolongo	259:42	164	27	3.74	83.54	0
