= 2014 IIHF Inline Hockey World Championship =

International sports tournament

Tournament details
- Host country: Czech Republic
- Venue(s): 1 (in 1 host city)
- Dates: 1 June – 7 June
- Teams: 8

Final positions
- Champions: Finland (4th title)
- Runner-up: Canada
- Third place: United States
- Fourth place: Sweden

Tournament statistics
- Games played: 23
- Goals scored: 196 (8.52 per game)
- Attendance: 11,210 (487 per game)
- Scoring leader(s): (United States) Travis Noe

The 2014 IIHF Inline Hockey World Championship was the 19th IIHF Inline Hockey World Championship, an international inline hockey tournament run by the International Ice Hockey Federation. The World Championship ran alongside the 2014 IIHF Inline Hockey World Championship Division I tournament and took place between 1 and 7 June 2014 in Pardubice, Czech Republic. The tournament was won by the Finland, earning their fourth World Championship title. Canada finished in second place and the United States in third after defeating Sweden in the bronze medal match. Great Britain, after losing the relegation game against Slovakia was relegated to Division I for 2015.

== Qualification ==
Seven of the eight teams automatically qualified for the 2014 IIHF Inline Hockey World Championship while the eighth spot was awarded to the winner of the 2013 IIHF Inline Hockey World Championship Division I tournament. The 2013 Division I tournament was won by Great Britain who defeated Austria in the final to earn promotion back to the World Championship after they were relegated in 2012.

- Canada − Finished third in the 2013 World Championship
- Czech Republic − Finished fifth in the 2013 World Championship
- Finland − Finished seventh in the 2013 World Championship
- Germany − Finished sixth in the 2013 World Championship
- Great Britain − Winner of 2013 IIHF Inline Hockey World Championship Division I
- Slovakia − Finished fourth in the 2013 World Championship
- Sweden − Finished second in the 2013 World Championship
- United States − Finished first in the 2013 World Championship

== Seeding and groups ==
The seeding in the preliminary round was based on the final standings at the 2013 IIHF Inline Hockey World Championship and 2013 IIHF Inline Hockey World Championship Division I. The World Championships groups are named Group A and Group B while the 2014 IIHF Inline Hockey World Championship Division I tournament use Group C and Group D, as both tournaments were held in Pardubice, Czech Republic. The teams were grouped accordingly by seeding at the previous year's tournament (in parentheses is the corresponding seeding):

Group C

- United States (1)
- Slovakia (4)
- Czech Republic (5)
- Great Britain (8)

Group D

- Sweden (2)
- Canada (3)
- Germany (6)
- Finland (7)

== Preliminary round ==
Eight participating teams were placed in the following two groups. After playing a round-robin, every team advanced to the Playoff round.

All times are local (UTC+2).

=== Group A ===
| Team | Pld | W | OTW | OTL | L | GF | GA | GD | Pts |
|---|---|---|---|---|---|---|---|---|---|
| United States | 3 | 3 | 0 | 0 | 0 | 21 | 7 | +14 | 9 |
| Czech Republic | 3 | 2 | 0 | 0 | 1 | 16 | 8 | +8 | 6 |
| Slovakia | 3 | 1 | 0 | 0 | 2 | 9 | 12 | −3 | 3 |
| Great Britain | 3 | 0 | 0 | 0 | 3 | 5 | 24 | −19 | 0 |

| 1 June 2014; 14:00 | Great Britain | 3 – 10 (1–1, 0–5, 1–3, 1–1) | United States | Pardubice Arena; Attendance: 150 |

Game reference

| 1 June 2014; 18:00 | Slovakia | 2 – 5 (0–2, 2–1, 0–1, 0–1) | Czech Republic | Pardubice Arena; Attendance: 2000 |

Game reference

| 2 June 2014; 15:00 | Slovakia | 7 – 1 (2–0, 3–1, 0–0, 2–0) | Great Britain | Pardubice Arena; Attendance: 150 |

Game reference

| 2 June 2014; 19:00 | United States | 5 – 4 (0–0, 2–1, 2–1, 1–2) | Czech Republic | Pardubice Arena; Attendance: 2000 |

Game reference

| 3 June 2014; 18:00 | Czech Republic | 7 – 1 (3–0, 3–1, 1–0, 0–0) | Great Britain | Pardubice Arena; Attendance: 800 |

Game reference

| 3 June 2014; 20:00 | United States | 6 – 0 (1–0, 2–0, 2–0, 1–0) | Slovakia | Pardubice Arena; Attendance: 150 |

Game reference

=== Group B ===
| Team | Pld | W | OTW | OTL | L | GF | GA | GD | Pts |
|---|---|---|---|---|---|---|---|---|---|
| Finland | 3 | 3 | 0 | 0 | 0 | 17 | 9 | +8 | 9 |
| Sweden | 3 | 1 | 1 | 0 | 1 | 13 | 14 | −1 | 5 |
| Canada | 3 | 1 | 0 | 0 | 2 | 10 | 11 | −1 | 3 |
| Germany | 3 | 0 | 0 | 1 | 2 | 6 | 12 | −6 | 1 |

| 1 June 2014; 16:00 | Canada | 3 – 1 (1–1, 0–0, 1–0, 1–0) | Germany | Pardubice Arena; Attendance: 450 |

Game reference

| 1 June 2014; 20:00 | Finland | 7 – 4 (0–0, 2–1, 2–3, 3–0) | Sweden | Pardubice Arena; Attendance: 210 |

Game reference

| 2 June 2014; 13:00 | Canada | 3 – 5 (2–1, 0–1, 0–2, 1–1) | Finland | Pardubice Arena; Attendance: 100 |

Game reference

| 2 June 2014; 17:00 | Sweden | 4 – 3 (OT) (1–1, 1–0, 0–2, 1–0, 1–0) | Germany | Pardubice Arena; Attendance: 400 |

Game reference

| 3 June 2014; 14:00 | Germany | 2 – 5 (2–1, 0–0, 0–0, 0–4) | Finland | Pardubice Arena; Attendance: 100 |

Game reference

| 3 June 2014; 16:00 | Sweden | 5 – 4 (1–1, 1–1, 2–1, 1–1) | Canada | Pardubice Arena; Attendance: 250 |

Game reference

== Playoff round ==
All eight teams advanced into the playoff round and were seeded into the quarterfinals according to their result in the preliminary round. The winning quarterfinalists advanced through to the semifinals, while the losing teams moved through to the placement round. Great Britain was relegated after losing the relegation game against Slovakia, while the Czech Republic finished fifth after defeating Great Britain and Germany finished sixth following their win over Slovakia in their placement round games. In the semifinals Finland defeated Sweden and Canada beat the United States, both advancing to the gold medal game. After losing the semifinals Sweden and the United States played off for the bronze medal with the United States winning 12–5. Finland defeated Canada 6–2 in the gold medal game, earning their fourth World Championship title.

Quarterfinals
B1 | Finland | 7
A4 | Great Britain | 2
B2 | Sweden | 12
A3 | Slovakia | 1
A1 | United States | 4
B4 | Germany | 1
A2 | Czech Republic | 5
B3 | Canada | 6

Semifinals
QF1 | Finland | 4
QF2 | Sweden | 2
QF3 | United States | 5
QF4 | Canada | 6

Finals
SF1 | Finland | 6
SF2 | Canada | 2
Bronze medal game
SF1 | Sweden | 5
SF2 | United States | 12

All times are local (UTC+2).

=== Quarterfinals ===
| 5 June 2014; 14:00 | Sweden | 12 – 1 (5–0, 2–1, 2–0, 3–0) | Slovakia | Pardubice Arena; Attendance: 200 |

Game reference

| 5 June 2014; 16:00 | United States | 4 – 1 (1–0, 0–0, 2–0, 1–1) | Germany | Pardubice Arena; Attendance: 400 |

Game reference

| 5 June 2014; 18:00 | Czech Republic | 5 – 6 (SO) (1–0, 2–1, 0–1, 2–3, 0–0, 0–1) | Canada | Pardubice Arena; Attendance: 2000 |

Game reference

| 5 June 2014; 20:00 | Finland | 7 – 2 (3–0, 3–1, 1–1, 0–0) | Great Britain | Pardubice Arena; Attendance: 150 |

Game reference

=== Placement round ===
| 6 June 2014; 13:00 | Slovakia | 4 – 5 (SO) (0–1, 0–2, 3–0, 1–1, 0–0, 0–1) | Germany | Pardubice Arena; Attendance: 100 |

Game reference

| 6 June 2014; 19:00 | Czech Republic | 6 – 1 (1–0, 3–0, 1–0, 1–1) | Great Britain | Pardubice Arena; Attendance: 300 |

Game reference

==== Relegation game ====
| 7 June 2014; 10:00 | Slovakia | 2 – 1 (0–1, 1–0, 0–0, 1–0) | Great Britain | Pardubice Arena; Attendance: 100 |

Game reference

=== Semifinals ===
| 6 June 2014; 15:00 | Finland | 4 – 2 (0–0, 1–0, 2–0, 1–2) | Sweden | Pardubice Arena; Attendance: 150 |

Game reference

| 6 June 2014; 17:00 | United States | 5 – 6 (SO) (2–2, 1–1, 1–2, 1–0, 0–0, 0–1) | Canada | Pardubice Arena; Attendance: 250 |

Game reference

=== Bronze medal game ===
| 7 June 2014; 16:30 | United States | 12 – 5 (3–2, 3–2, 2–1, 4–0) | Sweden | Pardubice Arena; Attendance: 300 |

Game reference

=== Gold medal game ===
| 7 June 2014; 19:00 | Finland | 6 – 2 (1–0, 1–1, 1–1, 3–0) | Canada | Pardubice Arena; Attendance: 500 |

Game reference

== Ranking and statistics ==
2014 IIHF InLine Hockey World Championship winners

Finland
4th title

=== Tournament Awards ===
- Best players selected by the directorate:
  - Best Goalkeeper: (Canada) Brett Leggat
  - Best Defenseman: (Finland) Sami Markkanen
  - Best Forward: (United States) Matt White

=== Final standings ===
The final standings of the tournament according to IIHF:

| Rk. | Team |
|---|---|
| 1st place, gold medalist(s) | Finland |
| 2nd place, silver medalist(s) | Canada |
| 3rd place, bronze medalist(s) | United States |
| 4. | Sweden |
| 5. | Czech Republic |
| 6. | Germany |
| 7. | Slovakia |
| 8. | Great Britain |

=== Scoring leaders ===
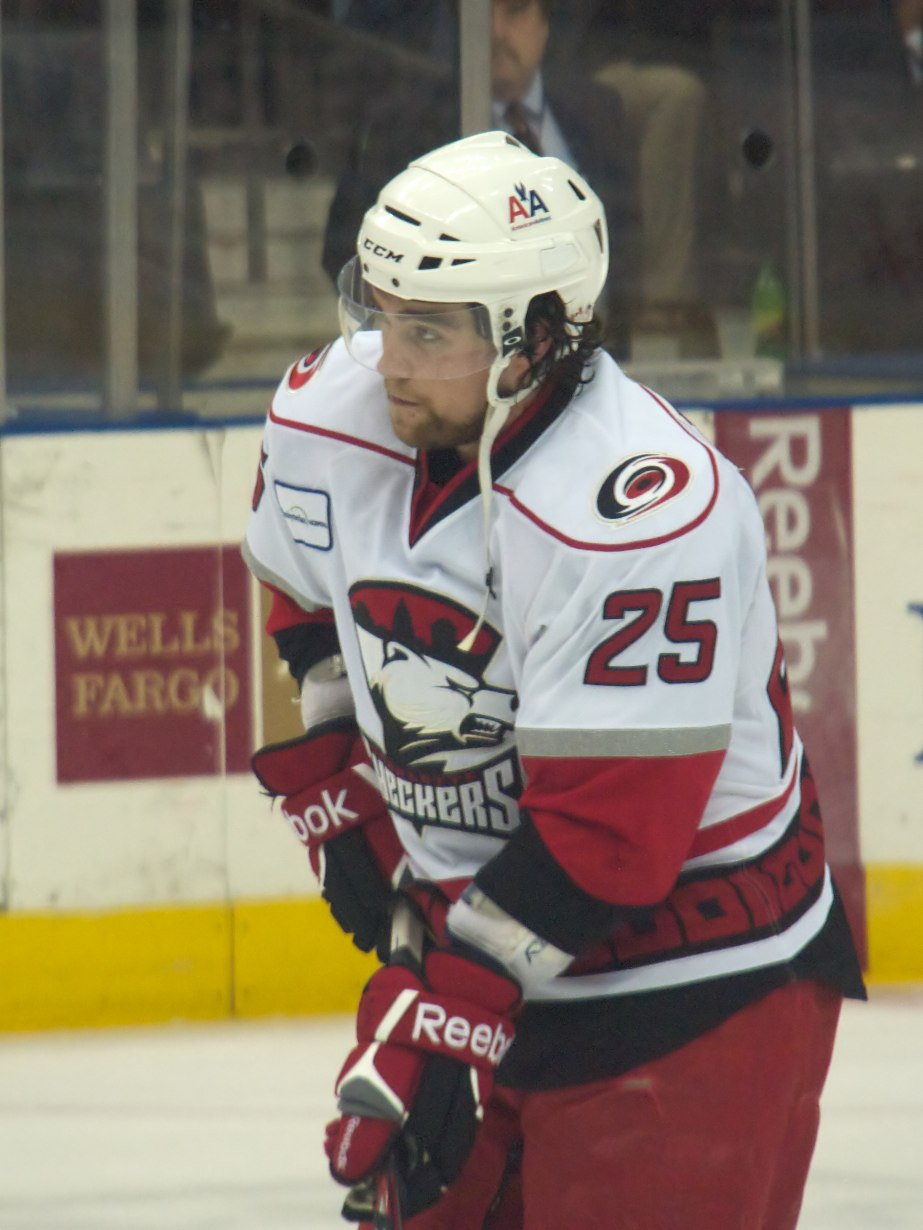
Canada's Chris Terry scored seven goals and four assists in his six games

List shows the top skaters sorted by points, then goals. If the list exceeds 10 skaters because of a tie in points, all of the tied skaters are shown.

| Player | GP | G | A | Pts | +/- | PIM | POS |
|---|---|---|---|---|---|---|---|
| (United States) Travis Noe | 6 | 8 | 12 | 20 | +8 | 3.0 | F |
| (United States) Matt White | 6 | 10 | 7 | 17 | +14 | 1.5 | F |
| (Sweden) Marcus Nilsson | 6 | 8 | 5 | 13 | –4 | 13.0 | F |
| (Czech Republic) Michal Simo | 5 | 4 | 9 | 13 | +16 | 0.0 | F |
| (United States) Patrick Lee | 6 | 7 | 5 | 12 | +7 | 3.0 | D |
| (Czech Republic) Patrik Sebek | 5 | 5 | 7 | 12 | +13 | 3.0 | D |
| (United States) Tyler Spezia | 6 | 5 | 7 | 12 | +12 | 4.5 | F |
| (Canada) Chris Terry | 6 | 7 | 4 | 11 | –5 | 3.0 | F |
| (Czech Republic) Martin Vozdecky | 5 | 7 | 4 | 11 | +11 | 0.0 | F |
| (United States) Rafael Rodriguez | 6 | 4 | 7 | 11 | +13 | 3.0 | D |
| (Canada) Dave Hammond | 6 | 3 | 8 | 11 | –2 | 6.0 | F |

=== Leading goaltenders ===
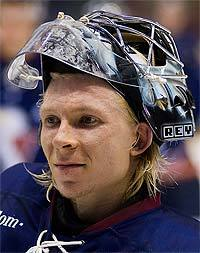
Finland's Sasu Hovi finished first among the goaltenders after finishing with a save percentage of 90.99

Only the top five goaltenders, based on save percentage, who have played at least 40% of their team's minutes are included in this list.

| Player | MIP | SOG | GA | GAA | SVS% | SO |
|---|---|---|---|---|---|---|
| (Finland) Sasu Hovi | 192:00 | 111 | 10 | 1.88 | 90.99 | 0 |
| (Germany) Thomas Ower | 196:23 | 138 | 16 | 2.93 | 88.41 | 0 |
| (Czech Republic) Dusan Salficky | 196:41 | 93 | 13 | 2.38 | 86.02 | 0 |
| (Canada) Brett Leggat | 295:38 | 174 | 25 | 3.04 | 85.63 | 0 |
| (Slovakia) Jozef Ondrejka | 148:50 | 92 | 15 | 3.63 | 83.70 | 0 |
