= Siniša Martinović =

Croatian ice hockey player

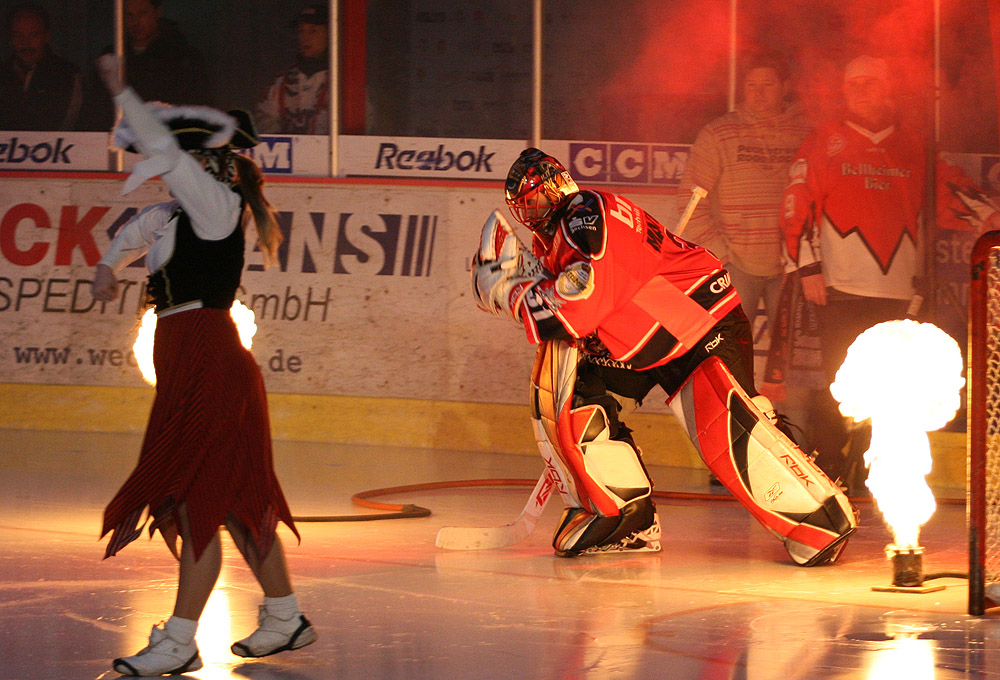
- Born: December 19, 1980 (age 44); Tuzla, Yugoslavia
- Height: 6 ft 2 in (188 cm)
- Weight: 176 lb (80 kg; 12 st 8 lb)
- Position: Goaltender
- Catches: Left
- 2.GBun team Former teams: Schwenninger Wild Wings; Kassel Huskies; Straubing Tigers; Iserlohn Roosters; Hamburg Freezers
- National team: Croatia
- NHL draft: Undrafted
- Playing career: 1999–present

Siniša Martinović (born December 19, 1980, in Tuzla) is a Croatian professional ice hockey goaltender who currently plays for the Schwenninger Wild Wings of the 2nd Bundesliga.
