= 2014 IIHF Inline Hockey World Championship Division I =

International sports tournament

Tournament details
- Host country: Czech Republic
- Venues: 2 (in 1 host city)
- Dates: 1 June – 7 June
- Teams: 8

Tournament statistics
- Games played: 22
- Goals scored: 198 (9 per game)
- Attendance: 1,908 (87 per game)
- Scoring leader: (Slovenia) Domen Vedlin

The 2014 IIHF Inline Hockey World Championship Division I was an international inline hockey tournament run by the International Ice Hockey Federation. The Division I tournament ran alongside the 2014 IIHF Inline Hockey World Championship and took place between 1 and 7 June 2014 in Pardubice, Germany. The tournament was won by Slovenia who upon winning gained promotion to the 2015 IIHF Inline Hockey World Championship. While Brazil and Japan were relegated after finishing last and second last respectively.

== Qualification ==
Three teams attempted to qualify for the one European spot remaining in the 2013 IIHF InLine Hockey World Championship Division I tournament, while Brazil automatically qualified for the Rest of the World spot as they were the only team who applied. The other six nations automatically qualified after their results from the 2013 World Championship and the 2013 Division I tournaments. The European qualification tournament was held in Passau, Germany with a place and was contested between Ireland, Latvia and Macedonia, with Lavia winning both of their games and earning a qualification spot.

- Australia − Finished fourth in 2013 World Championship Division I
- Austria − Finished second in 2013 World Championship Division I
- Brazil − Rest of the World Qualification
- Croatia − Finished fifth in 2013 World Championship Division I
- Hungary − Finished third in 2013 World Championship Division I
- Japan − Finished sixth in 2013 World Championship Division I
- Latvia − Winner of the European Qualification
- Slovenia − Relegated from the 2013 World Championship

=== European Qualification ===
The European Qualification tournament was held at the Eisarena in Passau, Germany from 9 August 2013 to 11 August 2013. Latvia gained promotion to Division I after winning both of their games and finishing first in the standings. Ireland finished in second place after winning their game against Macedonia.

Team	Pld	W	OTW	OTL	L	GF	GA	GD	Pts	Qualification
Latvia	2	2	0	0	0	48	1	+47	6	Qualified for Division I
Ireland	2	1	0	0	1	14	13	+1	3	
North Macedonia	2	0	0	0	2	1	49	−48	0	

All times are local.

9 August 2013; 18:00	North Macedonia	1 – 35 (0–7, 0–10, 1–6, 0–12)	Latvia	Eisarena

Game reference

10 August 2013; 18:00	Ireland	14 – 0 (5–0, 3–0, 6–0, 0–0)	North Macedonia	Eisarena

Game reference

11 August 2013; 11:00	Latvia	13 – 0 (2–0, 2–0, 2–0, 7–0)	Ireland	Eisarena

Game reference

== Seeding and groups ==
The seeding in the preliminary round was based on the final standings at the 2012 IIHF InLine Hockey World Championship and 2012 IIHF InLine Hockey World Championship Division I. Division I's groups are named Group C and Group D while the 2013 IIHF InLine Hockey World Championship use Group A and Group B, as both tournaments are held in Pardubice, Czech Republic. The teams were grouped accordingly by seeding at the previous year's tournament (in parentheses is the corresponding seeding):

Group C

- Slovenia (9)
- Australia (12)
- Croatia (13)
- Latvia (16)

Group D

- Austria (10)
- Hungary (11)
- Japan (14)
- Brazil (15)

== Preliminary round ==
Eight participating teams were placed in the following two groups. After playing a round-robin, every team advanced to the Playoff round.

All times are local (UTC+2).

=== Group C ===
Team	Pld	W	OTW	OTL	L	GF	GA	GD	Pts
Slovenia	3	3	0	0	0	22	9	+13	9
Croatia	3	2	0	0	1	10	10	0	6
Australia	3	1	0	0	2	12	13	−1	3
Latvia	3	0	0	0	3	8	20	−12	0

1 June 2014; 15:00	Latvia	4 – 9 (1–1, 0–2, 2–3, 1–3)	Slovenia	Pardubice Arena 2 Attendance: 50

Game reference

1 June 2014; 17:00	Australia	2 – 4 (0–0, 0–4, 1–0, 1–0)	Croatia	Pardubice Arena 2 Attendance: 200

Game reference

2 June 2014; 14:00	Australia	5 – 1 (0–0, 0–1, 3–0, 2–0)	Latvia	Pardubice Arena 2 Attendance: 21

Game reference

2 June 2014; 18:00	Slovenia	5 – 0 (0–0, 1–0, 1–0, 3–0)	Croatia	Pardubice Arena 2 Attendance: 115

Game reference

3 June 2014; 13:00	Croatia	6 – 3 (1–1, 1–1, 3–0, 1–1)	Latvia	Pardubice Arena 2 Attendance: 30

Game reference

3 June 2014; 15:00	Slovenia	8 – 5 (2–0, 2–1, 0–2, 4–2)	Australia	Pardubice Arena 2 Attendance: 100

Game reference

=== Group D ===
Team	Pld	W	OTW	OTL	L	GF	GA	GD	Pts
Austria	3	2	0	0	1	21	8	+13	6
Hungary	3	1	1	0	1	13	14	−1	5
Japan	3	1	0	1	1	9	15	−6	4
Brazil	3	1	0	0	2	9	15	−6	3

1 June 2014; 13:00	Brazil	0 – 8 (0–2, 0–1, 0–1, 0–4)	Austria	Pardubice Arena 2 Attendance: 120

Game reference

1 June 2014; 19:00	Hungary	4 – 3 (SO) (0–2, 0–0, 1–0, 2–1, 0–0, 1–0)	Japan	Pardubice Arena 2 Attendance: 200

Game reference

2 June 2014; 16:00	Hungary	3 – 6 (1–1, 1–1, 1–1, 0–3)	Brazil	Pardubice Arena 2 Attendance: 22

Game reference

2 June 2014; 20:00	Austria	8 – 2 (1–0, 2–0, 1–2, 4–0)	Japan	Pardubice Arena 2 Attendance: 50

Game reference

3 June 2014; 17:00	Austria	5 – 6 (2–2, 0–0, 3–3, 0–1)	Hungary	Pardubice Arena 2 Attendance: 40

Game reference

3 June 2014; 19:00	Japan	4 – 3 (1–1, 2–1, 0–0, 1–1)	Brazil	Pardubice Arena 2 Attendance: 150

Game reference

== Playoff round ==
All eight teams advanced into the playoff round and were seeded into the quarterfinals according to their result in the preliminary round. The winning quarter finalists advanced through to the semifinals, while the losing teams moved through to the placement round. Japan and Brazil were relegated after losing their placement round games, while Austria finished fifth after defeating Brazil and Hungary finished sixth following their win over Japan. In the semifinals Australia defeated Croatia and Slovenia beat Latvia, both advancing to the final. After losing the semifinals Croatia and Latvia played off for the bronze medal with Croatia winning 4–3. Slovenia defeated Australia 10–5 in the final and earned promotion to the 2015 IIHF Inline Hockey World Championship.

Quarterfinals
C2	Croatia	5
D3	Japan	2
D2	Hungary	1
C3	Australia	3
C1	Slovenia	7
D4	Brazil	1
D1	Austria	3
C4	Latvia	4

Semifinals
QF1	Croatia	5
QF2	Australia	6
QF3	Slovenia	13
QF4	Latvia	2

Finals
SF1	Australia	5
SF2	Slovenia	10
Bronze medal game
SF1	Croatia	4
SF2	Latvia	3

All times are local (UTC+2).

=== Quarterfinals ===
5 June 2014; 13:00	Croatia	5 – 2 (2–0, 0–1, 2–0, 1–1)	Japan	Pardubice Arena 2 Attendance: 50

Game reference

5 June 2014; 15:00	Hungary	1 – 3 (0–1, 0–0, 0–1, 1–1)	Australia	Pardubice Arena 2 Attendance: 60

Game reference

5 June 2014; 17:00	Slovenia	7 – 1 (0–0, 1–0, 3–1, 3–0)	Brazil	Pardubice Arena 2 Attendance: 120

Game reference

5 June 2014; 19:00	Austria	3 – 4 (SO) (1–0, 1–0, 0–1, 1–2, 0–0, 0–1)	Latvia	Pardubice Arena 2 Attendance: 70

Game reference

=== Placement round ===
6 June 2014; 14:00	Hungary	12 – 2 (2–1, 3–0, 3–0, 4–1)	Japan	Pardubice Arena 2 Attendance: 50

Game reference

6 June 2014; 16:00	Austria	5 – 1 (0–0, 4–1, 1–0, 0–0)	Brazil	Pardubice Arena 2 Attendance: 70

Game reference

=== Semifinals ===
6 June 2014; 18:00	Croatia	5 – 6 (OT) (2–1, 2–1, 1–0, 0–3, 0–1)	Australia	Pardubice Arena 2 Attendance: 40

Game reference

6 June 2014; 20:00	Slovenia	13 – 2 (2–1, 5–0, 3–0, 3–1)	Latvia	Pardubice Arena 2 Attendance: 50

Game reference

=== Third place game ===
7 June 2014; 12:00	Croatia	4 – 3 (1–2, 1–0, 1–1, 1–0)	Latvia	Pardubice Arena; Attendance: 100

Game reference

=== Final ===
7 June 2014; 14:00	Slovenia	10 – 5 (4–1, 3–0, 1–1, 2–3)	Australia	Pardubice Arena; Attendance: 200

Game reference

== Ranking and statistics ==
=== Standings ===
The final standings of the tournament according to IIHF:

Rk.	Team
1.	Slovenia
2.	Australia
3.	Croatia
4.	Latvia
5.	Austria
6.	Hungary
7.	Japan
8.	Brazil

=== Tournament Awards ===
- Best players selected by the directorate:
  - Best Goalkeeper: (Australia) Michael James
  - Best Defenseman: (Slovenia) Domen Vedlin
  - Best Forward: (Latvia) Artjoms Ogorodnikovs

=== Scoring leaders ===
List shows the top skaters sorted by points, then goals. If the list exceeds 10 skaters because of a tie in points, all of the tied skaters are shown.

Player	GP	G	A	Pts	+/-	PIM	POS
(Slovenia) Domen Vedlin	6	7	8	15	+12	1.5	D
(Austria) Harry Lange	5	3	12	15	+5	1.5	D
(Slovenia) Nejc Sotlar	6	5	9	14	+9	1.5	F
(Austria) Daniel Oberkofler	5	8	5	13	+10	0.0	F
(Slovenia) Jure Sotlar	6	8	5	13	+12	3.0	F
(Slovenia) Gal Koren	6	5	8	13	+8	3.0	F
(Slovenia) Mateuz Erman	6	4	9	13	+6	3.0	D
(Austria) Patrick Spannring	5	4	9	13	+12	0.0	F
(Slovenia) Matic Kralj	6	7	5	12	+7	4.5	F
(Slovenia) Gregor Krivic	6	3	9	12	+9	0.0	F

=== Leading goaltenders ===
Only the top five goaltenders, based on save percentage, who have played at least 40% of their team's minutes are included in this list.

Player	MIP	SOG	GA	GAA	SVS%	SO
(Austria) Lorenz Hirn	223:31	107	12	1.93	88.79	1
(Hungary) Tamas Kiss	207:21	111	14	2.43	87.39	0
(Japan) Keita Osawa	147:32	83	11	2.68	86.75	0
(Croatia) Mate Tomljenovic	243:46	112	16	2.36	85.71	0
(Latvia) Renars Kazanovs	202:22	148	25	4.45	83.11	0
