= Rustams Begovs =

Latvian ice hockey player

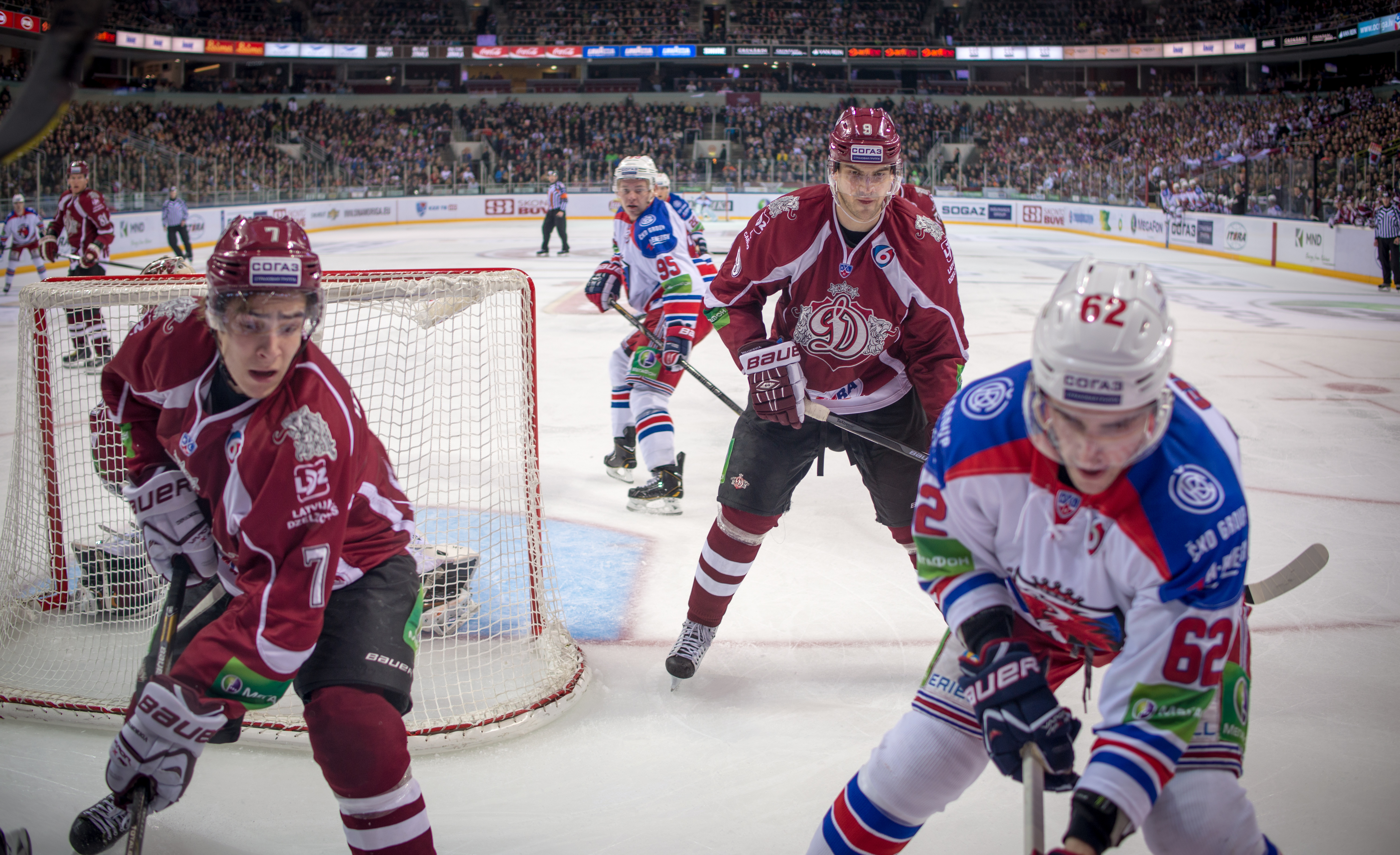
- Born: June 26, 1993 (age 32); Olaine, Latvia
- Height: 5 ft 10 in (178 cm)
- Weight: 154 lb (70 kg; 11 st 0 lb)
- Position: Center
- Shoots: Left
- KHL team (P) Cur. team: Dinamo Rīga; HK Rīga (MHL)
- National team: Latvia
- Playing career: 2013–present

Rustams Begovs (born June 26, 1993) is a Latvian ice hockey player currently playing for the HK Rīga of the MHL.

== Playing career ==
Begovs began his hockey career playing in minor and junior Latvian hockey leagues. In the 2011–2012 season he began playing in the Dinamo Riga system and in the 2012–2013 season he joined HK Rīga Dinamo Rīga minor league affiliate. On November 17 he made his KHL debut against HC Yugra.

=== International ===
Begovs participated at the 2012 World Junior Ice Hockey Championships as a member of the Latvia men's national junior ice hockey team.
