= Sasu Hovi =

Finnish ice hockey player and scout (born 1982)

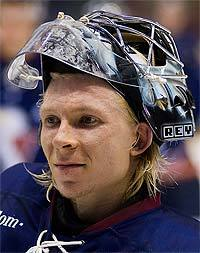
- Hovi with HC Slovan in 2007
- Born: 12 August 1982 (age 43) Toijala, Finland
- Height: 175 cm (5 ft 9 in)
- Weight: 72 kg (159 lb; 11 st 5 lb)
- Position: Goaltender
- Caught: Right
- Played for: Tappara; VHK Vsetín; HC Slovan Bratislava; HC Kometa Brno; Orli Znojmo
- NHL draft: Undrafted
- Playing career: 2001–2014

Sasu Hovi (born 12 August 1982) is a Finnish retired professional ice hockey goaltender. He has worked as a scout for the Seattle Kraken of the NHL since 2020.

During his goaltending career, Hovi played in the Finnish SM-Liiga with Tappara, the Czech Extraliga with VHK Vsetín and HC Kometa Brno, the Slovak Extraliga with HC Slovan Bratislava, and the Erste Bank Eishockey Liga with Orli Znojmo.

He served as an assistant coach to the Turkish men's national ice hockey team for the 2016 IIHF World Championship Division III.
