= 2013 IIHF Inline Hockey World Championship Division I =

International sports tournament

Tournament details
- Host country: Germany
- Venues: 2 (in 1 host city)
- Dates: 2 June – 8 June
- Teams: 8

Tournament statistics
- Games played: 22
- Goals scored: 215 (9.77 per game)
- Attendance: 1,100 (50 per game)
- Scoring leader: (United Kingdom) Philip Hamer

The 2013 IIHF Inline Hockey World Championship Division I was an international inline hockey tournament run by the International Ice Hockey Federation. The Division I tournament ran alongside the 2013 IIHF Inline Hockey World Championship and took place between 2 and 8 June 2013 in Dresden, Germany. The tournament was won by Great Britain who upon winning gained promotion to the 2014 IIHF Inline Hockey World Championship. While Bulgaria and Argentina were relegated after finishing last and second last respectively.

== Qualification ==
Six teams attempted to qualify for the two remaining spots in the 2013 IIHF InLine Hockey World Championship Division I tournament. The other six nations automatically qualified after their results from the 2012 World Championship and the 2012 Division I tournaments. Two qualification tournaments were held with a place awarded to the winner of each tournament. The European Qualification tournament was contested between Bulgaria, Latvia, Macedonia and Turkey, with Bulgaria winning promotion and returning to Division I after being relegated last year. The Rest of the World Qualification tournament was contested between Argentina and Brazil, with Argentina winning promotion. In addition to the Rest of the World tournament, Argentina B, Colombia, Uruguay and Venezuela joined Argentina and Brazil in a South American invitational tournament.

- Argentina − Winner of the Rest of the World Qualification
- Australia − Finished fifth in 2012 World Championship Division I
- Austria − Finished third in 2012 World Championship Division I
- Bulgaria − Winner of the European Qualification
- Croatia − Finished fourth in 2012 World Championship Division I
- Great Britain − Relegated from the 2012 World Championship
- Hungary − Finished second in 2012 World Championship Division I
- Japan − Finished sixth in 2012 World Championship Division I

=== European Qualification ===
The European Qualification tournament was held at the Winter Palace in Sofia, Bulgaria from 3 August 2012 to 5 August 2012. Bulgaria gained promotion to Division I after winning all of their games and finishing first in the standings. Latvia finished in second place after winning two of their games and losing the third against Bulgaria in overtime.

Team	Pld	W	OTW	OTL	L	GF	GA	GD	Pts	Qualification
Bulgaria	3	2	1	0	0	28	12	+16	8	Qualified for Division I
Latvia	3	2	0	1	0	47	12	+35	7	
Turkey	3	1	0	0	2	26	25	+1	3	
North Macedonia	3	0	0	0	3	8	60	−52	0	

All times are local.

3 August 2012; 18:00	North Macedonia	3 – 14 (0–2, 2–5, 0–3, 1–4)	Bulgaria	Winter Palace

Game reference

3 August 2012; 20:00	Turkey	4 – 14 (0–5, 1–2, 2–4, 1–3)	Latvia	Winter Palace

Game reference

4 August 2012; 18:00	Turkey	18 – 3 (3–0, 4–1, 4–2, 7–0)	North Macedonia	Winter Palace

Game reference

4 August 2012; 20:00	Bulgaria	6 – 5 (OT) (1–1, 1–0, 2–1, 1–3, 1–0)	Latvia	Winter Palace

Game reference

5 August 2012; 15:00	Latvia	28 – 2 (9–1, 8–0, 6–1, 5–0)	North Macedonia	Winter Palace

Game reference

5 August 2012; 17:00	Bulgaria	8 – 4 (3–0, 2–0, 1–1, 2–3)	Turkey	Winter Palace

Game reference

=== Rest of the World Qualification ===
The Rest of the World Qualification tournament was held in Buenos Aires, Argentina on 13 and 14 December 2012. Argentina gained promotion to Division I after winning both of their games against Brazil.

Team	Pld	W	OTW	OTL	L	GF	GA	GD	Pts	Qualification
Argentina	2	2	0	0	0	13	6	+7	6	Qualified for Division I
Brazil	2	0	0	0	2	6	13	−7	0	

All times are local.

13 December 2012; 20:00	Argentina	5 – 3 (2–0, 0–2, 1–0, 2–1)	Brazil	Buenos Aires

Game reference

14 December 2012; 20:00	Argentina	8 – 3 (2–1, 0–0, 2–1, 4–1)	Brazil	Buenos Aires

Game reference

==== South American invitational tournament ====
Following the Rest of the World tournament Argentina hosted a South American invitational tournament in Buenos Aires. Argentina B, Colombia, Uruguay and Venezuela joined Argentina and Brazil for the tournament. Brazil won the competition after defeating Colombia 5–3 in the final and Argentina beat Argentina B to finish third.

Preliminary round

15 December 2012; 14:00	Brazil	18 – 1	Uruguay	Buenos Aires

Game reference

15 December 2012; 15:30	Argentina	6 – 8	Colombia	Buenos Aires

Game reference

15 December 2012; 17:00	Brazil	5 – 1	Argentina B	Buenos Aires

Game reference

15 December 2012; 18:30	Argentina	11 – 0	Venezuela	Buenos Aires

Game reference

15 December 2012; 20:00	Uruguay	3 – 8	Argentina B	Buenos Aires

Game reference

15 December 2012; 21:30	Colombia	10 – 4	Venezuela	Buenos Aires

Game reference

5th placement

16 December 2012; 10:00	Uruguay	3 – 16	Venezuela	Buenos Aires

Game reference

16 December 2012; 14:30	Uruguay	4 – 9	Venezuela	Buenos Aires

Game reference

Semifinals

16 December 2012; 11:30	Argentina B	1 – 7	Colombia	Buenos Aires

Game reference

16 December 2012; 13:00	Brazil	3 – 1	Argentina	Buenos Aires

Game reference

3rd placement

16 December 2012; 16:00	Argentina	4 – 1	Argentina B	Buenos Aires

Game reference

1st placement

16 December 2012; 17:30	Brazil	5 – 3	Colombia	Buenos Aires

Game reference

== Seeding and groups ==
The seeding in the preliminary round was based on the final standings at the 2012 IIHF InLine Hockey World Championship and 2012 IIHF InLine Hockey World Championship Division I. Division I's groups are named Group C and Group D while the 2013 IIHF Inline Hockey World Championship use Group A and Group B, as both tournaments are held in Dresden, Germany. The teams were grouped accordingly by seeding at the previous year's tournament (in parentheses is the corresponding seeding):

Group C

- Great Britain (9)
- Croatia (12)
- Australia (13)
- Bulgaria (16)

Group D

- Hungary (10)
- Austria (11)
- Japan (14)
- Argentina (15)

== Preliminary round ==
Eight participating teams were placed in the following two groups. After playing a round-robin, every team advanced to the Playoff round.

All times are local (UTC+2).

=== Group C ===
Team	Pld	W	OTW	OTL	L	GF	GA	GD	Pts
Australia	3	2	0	1	0	27	11	+16	7
Great Britain	3	1	1	1	0	23	10	+13	6
Croatia	3	1	1	0	1	26	14	+12	5
Bulgaria	3	0	0	0	3	0	41	−41	0

2 June 2013; 13:00	Croatia	6 – 9 (1–5, 1–0, 2–3, 2–1)	Australia	Rink 2 Attendance: 80

Game reference

2 June 2013; 17:00	Bulgaria	0 – 13 (0–3, 0–3, 0–4, 0–3)	Great Britain	Rink 2 Attendance: 90

Game reference

3 June 2013; 13:00	Croatia	14 – 0 (3–0, 3–0, 4–0, 4–0)	Bulgaria	Rink 2 Attendance: 20

Game reference

3 June 2013; 17:00	Great Britain	5 – 4 (OT) (0–1, 1–0, 1–2, 2–1, 1–0)	Australia	Rink 2 Attendance: 40

Game reference

4 June 2013; 13:00	Australia	14 – 0 (2–0, 2–0, 3–0, 7–0)	Bulgaria	Rink 2 Attendance: 25

Game reference

4 June 2013; 17:00	Great Britain	5 – 6 (OT) (0–2, 2–1, 2–1, 1–1, 0–1)	Croatia	Rink 2 Attendance: 40

Game reference

=== Group D ===
Team	Pld	W	OTW	OTL	L	GF	GA	GD	Pts
Austria	3	3	0	0	0	15	5	+10	9
Hungary	3	1	1	0	1	10	7	+3	5
Japan	3	1	0	0	2	7	12	−5	3
Argentina	3	0	0	1	2	6	14	−8	1

2 June 2013; 15:00	Austria	5 – 1 (1–0, 3–0, 0–1, 1–0)	Japan	Rink 2 Attendance: 85

Game reference

2 June 2013; 19:00	Argentina	2 – 3 (SO) (1–1, 0–1, 1–0, 0–0, 0–0, 0–1)	Hungary	Rink 2 Attendance: 90

Game reference

3 June 2013; 15:00	Austria	6 – 1 (1–0, 4–1, 0–0, 1–0)	Argentina	Rink 2 Attendance: 40

Game reference

3 June 2013; 19:00	Hungary	4 – 1 (2–0, 0–0, 1–1, 1–0)	Japan	Rink 2 Attendance: 40

Game reference

4 June 2013; 15:00	Japan	5 – 3 (1–1, 2–0, 2–1, 0–1)	Argentina	Rink 2 Attendance: 30

Game reference

4 June 2013; 19:00	Hungary	3 – 4 (1–2, 0–0, 1–2, 1–0)	Austria	Rink 2 Attendance: 45

Game reference

== Playoff round ==
All eight teams advanced into the playoff round and were seeded into the quarterfinals according to their result in the preliminary round. The winning quarterfinalists advanced through to the semifinals, while the losing teams moved through to the placement round. Bulgaria and Argentina were relegated after losing their placement round games, while Croatia finished fifth after defeating Bulgaria and Japan finished sixth following their win over Argentina. In the semifinals Great Britain defeated Australia and Austria beat Hungary, both advancing to the final. After losing the semifinals Australia and Hungary played off for the bronze medal with Hungary winning 7–5. Great Britain defeated Austria 5–1 in the final and earned promotion to the 2014 IIHF Inline Hockey World Championship.

Quarterfinals
C1	Australia	5
D4	Argentina	4
C2	Great Britain	4
D3	Japan	2
D1	Austria	21
C4	Bulgaria	2
D2	Hungary	9
C3	Croatia	1

Semifinals
QF1	Australia	1
QF2	Great Britain	6
QF3	Austria	3
QF4	Hungary	2

Finals
SF1	Great Britain	5
SF2	Austria	1
Bronze medal game
SF1	Australia	5
SF2	Hungary	7

All times are local (UTC+2).

=== Quarterfinals ===
6 June 2013; 13:00	Great Britain	4 – 2 (2–0, 0–1, 2–1, 0–0)	Japan	Rink 2 Attendance: 20

Game reference

6 June 2013; 15:00	Hungary	9 – 1 (2–0, 1–0, 2–1, 4–0)	Croatia	Rink 2 Attendance: 20

Game reference

6 June 2013; 17:00	Australia	5 – 4 (SO) (2–1, 2–1, 0–1, 0–1, 0–0, 1–0)	Argentina	Rink 2 Attendance: 40

Game reference

6 June 2013; 19:00	Austria	21 – 2 (6–0, 5–1, 2–0, 8–1)	Bulgaria	Rink 2 Attendance: 20

Game reference

=== Placement round ===
7 June 2013; 13:00	Japan	5 – 2 (2–1, 0–0, 1–0, 2–1)	Argentina	Rink 2 Attendance: 40

Game reference

7 June 2013; 15:00	Croatia	14 – 2 (6–1, 2–1, 2–0, 4–0)	Bulgaria	Rink 2 Attendance: 40

Game reference

=== Semifinals ===
7 June 2013; 17:00	Australia	1 – 6 (0–1, 0–1, 0–3, 1–1)	Great Britain	Rink 2 Attendance: 40

Game reference

7 June 2013; 19:00	Austria	3 – 2 (2–0, 0–1, 1–0, 0–1)	Hungary	Rink 2 Attendance: 40

Game reference

=== Third place game ===
8 June 2013; 12:00	Australia	5 – 7 (1–3, 1–1, 2–1, 1–2)	Hungary	Rink 2 Attendance: 40

Game reference

=== Final ===
8 June 2013; 14:00	Austria	1 – 5 (0–0, 1–1, 0–1, 0–3)	Great Britain	Dresden Arena; Attendance: 175

Game reference

== Ranking and statistics ==
=== Standings ===
The final standings of the tournament according to IIHF:

Rk.	Team
1.	Great Britain
2.	Austria
3.	Hungary
4.	Australia
5.	Croatia
6.	Japan
7.	Argentina
8.	Bulgaria

=== Tournament Awards ===
- Best players selected by the directorate:
  - Best Goalkeeper: (Austria) Lorenz Hirn
  - Best Defenseman: (Australia) Antony Collins
  - Best Forward: (United Kingdom) Philip Hamer

=== Scoring leaders ===
List shows the top skaters sorted by points, then goals. If the list exceeds 10 skaters because of a tie in points, all of the tied skaters are shown.

Player	GP	G	A	Pts	+/-	PIM	POS
(United Kingdom) Philip Hamer	6	8	9	17	+9	0.0	F
(Austria) Johannes Bischofberger	6	7	9	16	+9	1.5	F
(Croatia) Igor Jacmenjak	5	7	8	15	+13	1.5	D
(Australia) Liam Jeffries	6	7	8	15	+15	1.5	F
(United Kingdom) Nathan Finney	6	5	10	15	+8	3.0	D
(Australia) Jordan Gavin	6	5	9	14	+10	7.5	F
(Austria) Harry Lange	6	5	8	13	+9	0.0	D
(Austria) Andre Niec	6	5	8	13	+12	1.5	D
(Hungary) Istvan Bartalis	6	6	6	12	+5	4.5	F
(Croatia) Tomisalv Grozaj	5	9	2	11	+1	0.0	F

=== Leading goaltenders ===
Only the top five goaltenders, based on save percentage, who have played at least 40% of their team's minutes are included in this list.

Player	MIP	SOG	GA	GAA	SVS%	SO
(United Kingdom) James Tanner	196:55	105	8	1.46	92.38	0
(Japan) Shingo Imagawa	120:00	60	5	1.50	91.67	0
(Austria) Lorenz Hirn	168:00	79	7	1.50	91.14	0
(Hungary) Tamas Kiss	245:00	132	15	2.20	88.64	0
(Argentina) Federico Fernandez	153:44	73	12	2.81	83.56	0
