= Australia men's national inline hockey team =

Australia
- Association: Ice Hockey Australia; Skate Australia
- General manager: Martin Jones
- Head coach: Stuart Philps
- Team colors
- IIHF code: AUS

IIHF InLine Hockey World Championship
- Appearances: 19 (first in 1996)
- Best result: 9th (in 2000)

The Australia men's national inline hockey team represents Australia in international inline hockey competitions. They are controlled by Ice Hockey Australia for events organised by the International Ice Hockey Federation and by Skate Australia for events organised by the International Roller Sports Federation. Australia plays in Division I of the IIHF InLine Hockey World Championship and Group C at the FIRS Inline Hockey World Championships.

== Governing bodies ==
The Australia men's inline hockey team is controlled by two governing bodies. Ice Hockey Australia controls the Australian team in events organised by the International Ice Hockey Federation. They are the governing body for all ice hockey in Australia also responsible for fielding teams in international ice hockey tournaments. Skate Australia controls the Australian team in all other inline hockey tournaments through their umbrella association Inline Hockey Australia and are the recognised national federation for roller sports in Australia by the International Roller Sports Federation. Skate Australia is the controlling body of roller sports in Australia including artistic roller skating, inline speed skating, roller hockey, roller derby, skateboarding and aggressive inline skating.

== History ==
Australia men's national inline hockey team
Medal record

Men's IIHF Inline Hockey

World Championships
Bronze medal – third place	2003 Germany	Division I
Silver medal – second place	2014 Czech Republic	Division I
Silver medal – second place	2015 Finland	Division I
Bronze medal – third place	2017 Slovakia	Division I

In 1996 Australia first competed in the inaugural IIHF InLine Hockey World Championship held in Minneapolis and Saint Paul, Minnesota, United States. Australia finished tenth out of the 11 teams competing. In 2000 Australia finished with their best result and finished ninth overall at the World Championship. Australia continued to compete in the annual World Championships missing only the 2002 tournament.

Following the split of the World Championship in 2003 into two division, Top division and Division I, Australia was relegated into Division I. They finished with their best result in the Division I tournament finishing third behind Japan and Brazil. In 2006 Australia suffered their worst ever finish at the World Championships finishing 14th out of 16 teams.

== International competitions ==
=== IIHF Inline Hockey World Championship ===
- 1996 – 10th
- 1997 – 11th
- 1998 – 14th
- 1999 – No tournament held
- 2000 – 9th
- 2001 – 10th
- 2002 – Did not participate
- 2003 – 11th (3rd in Division I)
- 2004 – 13th (5th in Division I)
- 2005 – 13th (5th in Division I)
- 2006 – 14th (6th in Division I)
- 2007 – 12th (4th in Division I)
- 2008 – 12th (4th in Division I)
- 2009 – 13th (5th in Division I)
- 2010 – 12th (4th in Division I)
- 2011 – 12th (4th in Division I)
- 2012 – 13th (5th in Division I)
- 2013 – 12th (4th in Division I)
- 2014 – 10th (2nd in Division I)
- 2015 – 10th (2nd in Division I)
- 2017 – 11th (3rd in Division I)

== Roster ==
From the 2017 IIHF Inline Hockey World Championship Division I

#	Name	Pos	S/G	Date of birth	Team
49	Matthew Anderson	F	R	5 March 1991	Bayswater Falcons
73	Steve Best	F	R	29 March 1992	Adelaide Aliens
9	Antony Collins	D	R	3 July 1985	Raptors
32	Liam Finning	G	R	13 October 1994	Skaters Network
79	Brenton Fitzgerald	F	R	13 April 1988	Dogs
19	Jordan Gavin	D	R	22 September 1982	ACT
24	Kaden Goulds	D	R	12 March 1992	Stars
68	Michael Haynes	F	L	11 March 1986	Sydney Suits
3	Mitchell Henning	F	R	2 November 1997	Brisbane Kings
36	Michael James	G	L	15 March 1990	Inferno
17	Liam Jeffries	F	R	3 February 1990	Stars
15	Sean Jones	D	L	26 May 1985	Mission Snipers
8	Jayden Ryan	F	R	31 October 1992	Sydney Suits
10	Adam St Clair	D	R	17 January 1991	Adelaide Aliens
14	Cameron Todd	D	R	21 July 1994	Pirates
