= Yunus (given name) =

- Pronunciation: Arabic: [juːnus]; Persian: [juːnes]
- Gender: Male

Origin
- Origin: Hebrew
- Meaning: Dove, peaceful being

Other names
- Related names: Jonah, Jonas, Joonas, Yonah, Janusz

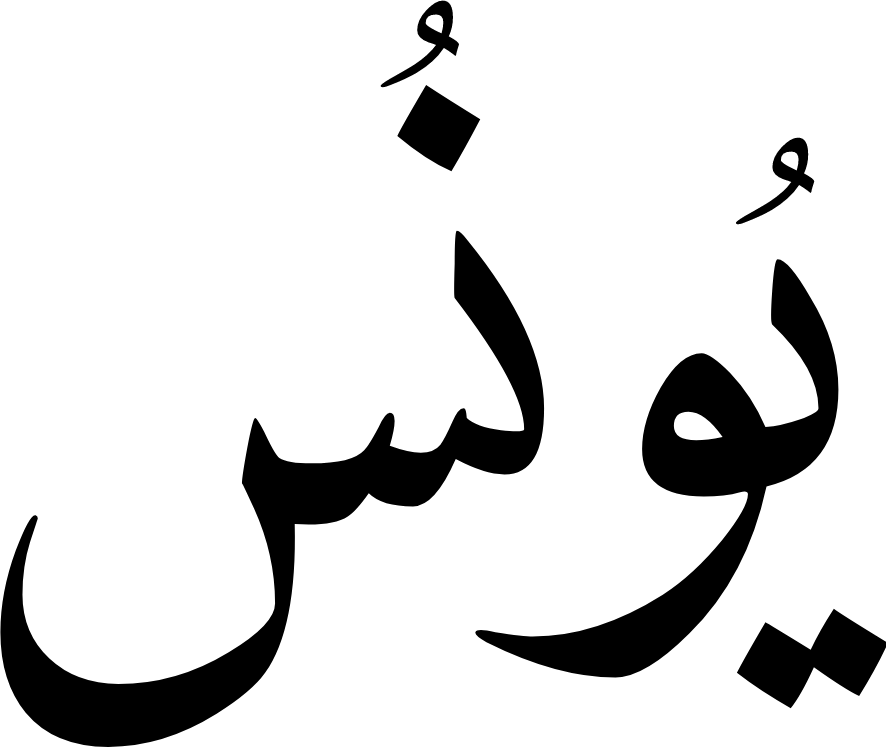
Yunus in Quran

Yunus (Arabic: يُونُس, Yūnus, Persian: یونس, yūnes, Turkish: Yunus), also spelled Younas, Younes, Younis, Younous, Younus, Yunes, Yunis, Yunos and Yonas, is a common male given name, the Arabic version of the Greek Ιωνάς (Ionas), from the Hebrew יוֹנָה Jonah 'dove'.

== People with the given name ==
=== Younas ===
- Younas Ahmadzai (born 1995), Afghan cricketer

=== Younes ===
- Younes Abdulsalam (born 1996), Yemeni journalist
- Younes Ahamdi (born 1976), Moroccan judoka
- Younes Ahmad (born 1991), Emirati footballer
- Younes Ahmed (born 1963), Qatari footballer
- Younes Aitamer (born 2003), Algerian footballer
- Younes Akbarpour (born 2000), Iranian football player
- Younes Al-Shanqeeti (born 2004), Saudi Arabian footballer
- Younes Alaiwi (born 1990), Saudi Arabian footballer
- Younes Ali (born 1983), Qatari footballer
- Younes Asadi (born 1963), Iranian politician
- Younes Ayachi (born 2008), Algerian high jumper
- Younes El Aynaoui (born 1971), Moroccan tennis player
- Younes Bahonar (born 1977), Iranian footballer
- Younes Bakiz (born 1999), Danish footballer
- Younès Belhanda (born 1990), Footballer
- Younes Boudadi (born 1996), Moroccan footballer
- Younes Chaib (born 1984), French footballer
- Younes Delfi (born 2000), Iranian footballer
- Younes Ebnoutalib (born 2003), German footballer
- Younes Elamine (born 1979), Musical artist
- Younes Emami (born 1987), Iranian freestyle wrestler
- Younès Essalhi (born 1993), Moroccan long-distance runner
- Younes Hamed (born 1959), Egyptian air marshal
- Younes El Hannach (born 2004), French footballer
- Younes Idrissi (born 1984), Moroccan basketball player
- Younès Ifticen (born 1957), Algerian football manager
- Younes Jaele (born 1962), Iranian businessman
- Younès Kaabouni (born 1995), French footballer
- Younes Kaboul (born 1986), French footballer
- Younès Kadri (born 1991), Algerian footballer
- Younes Khattabi (born 1984), Moroccan rugby league footballer
- Younes Lachaab (born 2005), French footballer
- Younes Lalami (born 2001), Moroccan tennis player
- Younes Hamami Lalehzar (born 1967), Iranian rabbi, physician, and community leader
- Younes Bnou Marzouk (born 1996), Footballer
- Younes Masoudi (born 1981), Iranian footballer
- Younès Moudrik (born 1977), Moroccan long jumper
- Younes Mazhoud (born 1991), Tunisian footballer
- Younes Megri (born 1951), Moroccan singer and artist
- Younes Bensouda Mourri, Moroccan computer scientist and educator
- Younes Namli (born 1994), Danish footballer
- Younes Nazarian (1929–2022), Iranian-American businessman and philanthropist
- Younes Nemouchi (born 1993), Algerian boxer
- Younès Rachidi (born 1986), Moroccan tennis player
- Younes Reggab (born 1975), Moroccan filmmaker and screenwriter
- Younes Sarmasti (born 1994), Iranian wrestler
- Younes Sekkat (born 1974), Moroccan taekwondo practitioner
- Younes Sekkouri (born 1981), Moroccan politician
- Younes Shakeri (born 1989), Iranian footballer
- Younes Al Shibani (born 1981), Libyan footballer
- Younes Shokrkhah (born 1957), Iranian journalist and academician
- Younes Smaili (born 1998), Dutch-Moroccan kickboxer
- Younes Taha (born 2002), Footballer
- Younes Tsouli, Moroccan terrorist
- Younes Yaqoub (born 1986), Qatari footballer
- Younes Zerdouk (born 1973), French footballer

=== Younis ===
- Younis Ahmed (born 1947), Pakistani former first-class cricketer
- Younis Mohammed Ibrahim al-Hayari (1969–2005), Member of Al-Qaeda killed in Saudi Arabia
- Younis Mubarak Al-Mahaijri (born 1987), Omani footballer
- Younis al-Mauritani (born 1981), Member of al-Qaeda
- Younis Al-Mushaifri (born 1981), Omani footballer
- Younis Abed Ali (born 1968), Iraqi footballer
- Younis Amaan, Omani footballer
- Younis Bahri (1900–1979), Iraqi traveler, journalist, and author
- Younis Bese (born 1996), Rugby player
- Younis Habib (c. 1940–2019), Pakistani banker
- Younis Khamis (born 1982), Emirati basketball player
- Younis Khan (born 1977), Pakistani cricket coach and former cricketer
- Younis Mahmoud (born 1983), Iraqi footballer
- Younis Eyal Slman (born 1993), Jordanian judoka
- Younis Tirawi, Palestinian journalist

=== Younous ===
- Younous Omarjee (born 1969), French politician
- Younous Oumouri (born 1975), Malagasy footballer

=== Younus ===
- Younus AlGohar (born 1970), British-Pakistani activist
- Younus Changezi (born 1944), Pakistani footballer and politician
- Younus Rana (born 1941), Pakistani footballer
- Younus Shaikh (born 1952), Pakistani medical doctor, human rights activist
- Younus Shaikh (author) (born 1965), Pakistani author
- Younus Soomro (died 2020), Pakistani orthopedic surgeon and caretaker minister

=== Yunis ===
- Yunis Khatayer Abbas, Iraqi journalist
- Yunis Abdelhamid (born 1987), Footballer
- Yunis Aliyev (1958–1992), National Hero of Azerbaijan
- Yunis Al Astal (born 1956), Palestinian politician and preacher
- Yunis Hunnar (died 2015), Palestinian jihadist
- Yunis Huseynov (born 1965), Azerbaijani footballer
- Yunis Makhyun (born 1955), Egyptian politician
- Yunis Najafov (1967–1992), Azerbaijani military officer and war hero
- Yunis Nuri (1878–1950), Azerbaijani actor
- Yunis Safarov, Azerbaijani Islamist
- Yunis Abdurrahman Shokuri (born 1968), Moroccan detainee in Guantanamo

=== Yunos ===
- Yunos Yusof (born 1965), Bruneian footballer and coach

=== Yunus ===
- Yunus Nadi Abalıoğlu (1879–1945), Turkish journalist
- Yunus Akgün (born 2000), Turkish footballer
- Yunus Akintunde, Nigerian politician
- Yunus al-Katib al-Mughanni (8th century), Iranian composer and writer
- Yunus Ali (1886–1952), Bengali Muslim Sufi saint
- Yunus Alif (born 1958), Malaysian football manager
- Yunus Altun (born 1977), Turkish footballer
- Yunus Emre Arslan (born 2005), Turkish compound archer
- Yunus Badat (born 1943), Zambian cricketer
- Yunus Bahadır (born 2002), Belgian footballer
- Yunus Bandu (1942–2023), Indonesian military officer and politician
- Yunus Emre Başar (born 1995), Turkish Greco-Roman wrestler
- Yunus Bikbov (1883–1942), Bashkir statesman
- Yunus Çankaya (born 1985), Turkish basketball player
- Yunus Carrim (born 1956), South African politician
- Yunus Ceylan (born 1979), Turkish footballer
- Yunus Emre Çift (born 2003), Turkish footballer
- Yunus Emre Dede (born 1995), Turkish freestyle wrestler
- Yunus Emre (1238–1320), Turkish Sufi and folk poet
- Yunus Erçelik (born 1980), Turkish motorcycle racer
- Yunus Gülnar (born 1997), Belgian footballer
- Yunus ibn Habib, 8th-century AD Iranian poet and linguist
- Yunus Hussain (1935-1965), Pakistani war hero
- Yunus İçuz (born 1983), Turkish footballer
- Yunus Jaffery (1930–2016), Indian writer and translator
- Yunus Jaunpuri (1937–2017), Indian Islamic Scholar
- Yunus Khan (c. 1416 – 1487), Khan of Moghulistan
- Yunus Khan (politician) (born 1964), Indian politician
- Yunus Emre Konak (born 2006), Turkish footballer
- Yunus Mallı (born 1992), Footballer
- Yunus Mohamed (1950–2008), South African lawyer and activist
- Yunus Musah (born 2002), American soccer player
- Yunus Mussa, Malawi politician
- Yunus Öçal (born 1988), Turkish volleyball coach
- Yunus Özel (born 1987), Turkish Greco-Roman wrestler
- Yunus Parvez (1931/32–2007), Indian actor
- Yunus Pasha (died 1517), Grand Vizier of the Ottoman Empire
- Yunus Qanuni (born 1957), Afghan politician
- Yunus Rahmatullah (born 1982), Pakistani held on terrorist charges
- Yunus Rajabiy (1897–1976), Uzbek composer and academic
- Yunus Sarı (born 1991), Turkish taekwondo practitioner
- Yunus Şencay (born 1997), Turkish footballer
- Yunus Sentamu (born 1994), Ugandan footballer
- Yunus Emre Sonsırma (born 1992), Turkish basketball player
- Yunus Nüzhet Unat (1913–1999), Turkish cyclist
- Yunus Wonda (born 1972), Indonesian politician
- Yunus Emre Yalçın (born 1994), Turkish footballer
- Yunus Yosfiah (born 1944), Indonesian general

== See also ==
- Yunus (disambiguation)
- Yunus (surname)
