= List of blasphemy cases in Pakistan =

According to human rights groups, blasphemy laws in Pakistan are often exploited, even against Muslims, to settle personal rivalries or to persecute minorities. Almost any person that speaks out against blasphemy laws or proceedings is in danger of being lynched or killed by a mob.

Arrests and death sentences issued for blasphemy laws in Pakistan go back to the late 1980s and early 1990s. Despite the implementation of these laws, no one has yet been executed by the order of the courts or government. People have only been imprisoned to await a verdict or killed at the hands of felons who were convinced that the suspects were guilty.

== Incidents ==
Year	Case
1996	On 14 October, Pakistani police arrested Ayub Masih, a Christian bricklayer, for violation of penal code § 295 – C. Muhammad Akram, a Muslim neighbour of Masih, complained to the police that Masih had said Christianity was right, and Masih had suggested that Akram read Salman Rushdie's Satanic Verses. The same day that Masih was arrested, Muslim villagers forced the entire Christian population of Masih's village (fourteen families) to leave the village. Masih's family had applied under a government program that gave housing plots to landless people. Local landlords resented Masih's application because the landlords had been able to oblige landless Christians to work in the fields in exchange for a place to live. Masih's application gave him a way out of his subservience to the landlords. Upon Masih's arrest, the authorities gave Masih's plot to Akram. Akram shot and injured Masih in the halls of the Session Court at Sahiwal on 6 November 1997. Four assailants also attacked Masih in jail. The authorities took no action against Akram or against the other assailants. On 20 April 1998, Judge Abdul Khan sentenced Masih to death and levied a fine of 100,000 rupees. Two judges of the Lahore High Court heard Masih's appeal on 24 July 2001. Shortly thereafter, the judges affirmed the judgment of the trial court. On 16 August 2002, the Supreme Court of Pakistan set aside the judgment of the lower courts. The Supreme Court noted Akram's acquisition of Masih's property and concluded the case had been fabricated for personal gain. The court also noted other breaches in the law of due process.
1997	On 6 and 7 February, a mob of approximately 30,000 Muslims burned and looted the villages of Shanti Nagar and Tibba near Khanewal in Punjab. The riot began after loudspeakers accused the local Christian population of ripping pages from the Quran and scribbling insults against Mohammed in the margins. The attacks saw the destruction of at least 785 homes as well four churches and forced over 2,500 Christians to flee. In 2013, villagers in Shanti Nagar erected the then largest cross in Pakistan in memory of the attack.
2000	In October, Pakistani authorities charged Younus Shaikh, a physician, with blasphemy on account of remarks that students claimed he made during a lecture. The students alleged that, inter alia, Shaikh had said Muhammad's parents were non-Muslims because they died before Islam existed. A judge ordered that Shaikh pay a fine of 100,000 rupees, and that he be hanged. On 20 November 2003, a court retried the matter and acquitted Shaikh, who fled Pakistan for Switzerland soon thereafter.
2005	On 11 August, Judge Arshad Noor Khan of the Anti-Terrorist Court found a different Younus Shaikh guilty of "defiling a copy of the Quran, outraging religious feelings and propagating religious hatred among society." Shaikh was arrested after openly distributing copies of his book, Shaitan Maulvi (Satanic Cleric), in which he wrote that stoning to death was not mentioned in the Quran as a punishment for adultery. The book also said that four historical imams were Jews. The judge imposed upon Shaikh a fine of 100,000 rupees, and sentenced him to spend his life in jail.
2005	On 23 December, five men from the Mehdi Foundation International were arrested in Lahore for putting up posters of their leader, Riaz Gohar Shahi, which claimed that he was the Mahdi. They were all later sentenced to five years each by the Anti-Terrorism Court for violation of penal code § 295-A.
2006	On 3 June, following protests by the country's Christian minority, Pakistan banned the film The Da Vinci Code for theorizing about the descendants of Jesus Christ. Although the book had been available for some time, culture minister Ghulam Jamal said that "Islam teaches us to respect all the prophets of God Almighty and degradation of any prophet is tantamount to defamation of the rest."
2009	On 22 January, Hector Aleem, a Christian peace activist, was arrested in Islamabad after having allegedly sent a member of Sunni Tehreek a blasphemous text message.
2009	In June, Asia Bibi, a Catholic woman from Punjab, was arrested and prosecuted under penal code 295C after supposedly making derogatory remarks about the Islamic prophet Muhammad. Bibi was convicted and sentenced to death in November 2010, as well as fined the equivalent of $1,100. On 8 October 2018, following several unsuccessful appeals, Bibi's death sentence was overturned by Pakistan's Supreme Court. However, she was prevented from leaving the country by order of the Government of Pakistan until 8 May 2019 when she was reunited with her family in Canada.
2009	In July, eight Pakistani Christians were killed in the Punjabi town of Gojra after members of the then-banned Sipah-e-Sahaba attacked and burned their homes. Christians in the neighboring village of Korrian had allegedly torn up pages of the Quran during a wedding, but the Federal Minister for Minorities Shahbaz Bhatti said this was untrue and that the police had ignored his instructions to protect Gojra's Christian community.
2010	In July, a trader in Faisalabad complained that one of his employees had been handed a pamphlet which contained disrespectful remarks about Muhammad. According to the police, the pamphlet appeared to have the signatures and addresses of Pastor Rashid Emmanuel and his brother Sajid, who were Christians. The brothers were shot and killed while being escorted by the police from a district court. Both had denied the charge of blasphemy. Following their murder, rumors spread that angry Christians were burning Muslim homes, prompting hundreds of Muslim men to gather in Christian neighborhoods. They then clashed with nearby Christians before the police dispersed the crowd. An anti-terrorism court later sentenced Maqsood Ahmed, a Muslim man, to death for the double-murder of Rashid and Sajid.
2011	On 4 January, Salman Taseer, govern of Punjab, was shot dead in Islamabad by his bodyguard Mumtaz Qadri for his opposition to Pakistan's blasphemy laws and his support for Asia Bibi. Qadri was sentenced to death on 1 October by an anti-terrorism court and, after several failed appeals, was executed on 29 February 2016.
2011	On 2 March, Shahbaz Bhatti, who was a Catholic member of the National Assembly, was killed by gunmen in Islamabad as he was travelling to work, a few weeks after he had vowed to defy death threats over his efforts to reform Pakistan's blasphemy laws.
2012	In August, a Christian girl named Rimsha Masih was arrested for blasphemy in Islamabad for allegedly burning pages of a Quran or a book containing verses from the Quran. Masih, who was described as being between the ages of 11 and 16, could not read or write. The charges against her were dropped following widespread international concern. Masih and her family left Pakistan shortly thereafter to settle in Canada.
2013	On 18 June, Shafqat Emmanuel and Shagufta Kausar, a Christian couple from Gojra, were arrested for allegedly sending a mosque cleric a text message that insulted Muhammad. The couple, who are illiterate, claimed that the offending text had been sent from a lost mobile phone and that the case was motivated by a personal grudge. On 4 April 2014, they were both convicted and sentenced to death. On 3 June 2021, the Lahore High Court overturned the convictions due to lack of evidence and the couple were shortly thereafter granted asylum in an unspecified European country.
2014	In January, Muhammad Asghar, a 70-year-old British man from Edinburgh, was convicted of blasphemy and sentenced to death by a court in Rawalpindi. Asghar had initially been arrested in 2010 after sending letters in which he declared himself a prophet, and had lived in Pakistan for several years prior to his arrest and trial. Following a stroke in 2010, doctors in Edinburgh diagnosed Asghar with paranoid schizophrenia. He spent a month in a psychiatric hospital before leaving for Pakistan. In September 2014, Asghar was shot in the back by a prison guard for reasons unknown.
2014	On 4 November, a Christian couple, Shahzad Masih and his pregnant wife Shama Masih, were beaten and burned to death in a brick kiln by a mob in Kot Radha Kishan after being accused of burning the Quran. Shama Masih had burned several possessions of a recently deceased relative outside her home a few days before, including various talismans and charms. Allegations then spread to neighboring villages that Masih had destroyed a Quran, prompting local clerics to issue a fatwa against the couple. On the day of the attack, a crowd of about 500 people stormed the kiln where they worked, took them from their room, and killed them. On 23 November 2016, an antiterrorism court sentenced five people to death in connection with the murders; however, two of them were later acquitted in 2019.
2014	On 5 November, Haider Tufail Naqvi, a Shia Muslim, was hacked to death in his Gujrat prison cell by a police officer for allegedly making derogatory remarks about the companions of Muhammad. Naqvi, who was reportedly mentally unstable, had been detained the day before after being assaulted by a group of individuals for making suspected blasphemous remarks. He supposedly kept making these remarks until assistant sub-inspector Faraz Naveed went into Naqvi's cell early in the morning and killed him with an axe. Naveed was arrested and given a double death sentence on 27 February 2016, pending an appeal in the Lahore High Court.
2016	In first of its kind case, a 30-year-old Shiite Taimoor Raza has been sentenced to death by Anti-Terror Court, for posting blasphemous content on Facebook. He was booked in 2016 after he engaged in sectarian debate with a counter-terrorism official on Facebook.
2016	On 9 September 2016, A Pakistani Christian and evangelist, attacked by Muslims near Awan Choke, Khanewal, Pakistan. Three Muslim extremists attacked by stabbing, punching, and kicking, luckily, the evangelist escaped by running from the spot.
2016	In November, a Facebook campaign was launched by the followers of Khadim Hussain Rizvi, against Malik Shahrukh, a PhD researcher who was previously associated with an Islamabad-based diplomatic news publication. Malik was accused of calling the Quran "an ordinary book, produced by Mohammad for economic and political purposes." A video of the local Imam of Sargodha, in which he incited people during the Friday sermon to kill Malik, went viral. Several applications were made to the authorities against Malik, demanding that he be sentenced to death. Authorities could not arrest Malik because he was not in Pakistan at the time. Sources claim that Malik is being framed for criticizing Tahreek-e-Labbaik and its chief.
2017	In March, Prime Minister of Pakistan Nawaz Sharif supported a crackdown on blasphemous material posted on social media and described blasphemy as an "unpardonable offence". Shortly after, Pakistani blogger Ayaz Nizami, founder of realisticapproach.org, an Urdu website about atheism, and Vice President of Atheist & Agnostic Alliance Pakistan, was detained under the charges of blasphemy and could face the death penalty.
2017	In April, Mashal Khan, a Pakistani student at the Abdul Wali Khan University Mardan, was killed by an angry mob following allegations that he posted blasphemous content online.
2017	In July, Faisal Mahmood was charged with blasphemy law U/S 295C by the court of magistrate special judicial Gujarat and could be sentenced to death.
2017	In December, a 58-year-old man accused of blasphemy was freed after spending over nine years in jail. Bahawalnagar District court and Lahore High Court sentenced the man to life imprisonment which was overruled by Supreme Court of Pakistan as the evidence used was not in accordance with the Evidence Act.
2019	Junaid Hafeez, formerly a lecturer at Bahauddin Zakariya University in Multan, was sentenced to death for blasphemy after being arrested in 2013 and accused of insulting Muhammad on Facebook. Hafeez's first attorney, Rashid Rehman, was murdered in his office in 2014 after agreeing to represent Hafeez. The verdict prompted an outcry from human rights groups; Amnesty International called it a "vile and gross miscarriage of justice."
2020	On 10 June, Sajid Soomro, an assistant professor at Shah Abdul Latif University, was arrested after allegedly writing criticisms of various religious beliefs as well as of Pakistan. A professor from the University of Sindh, Arfana Mallah, was later pressured by members of Jamiat Ulema-e-Islam, a Sunni political party, for supporting Soomro and criticizing the blasphemy law. The Human Rights Commission of Pakistan condemned the attacks against both Soomro and Mallah as "attempts to scuttle academic freedom by targeting intellectuals on flimsy grounds."
2020	In July, Qamar Riaz, a local leader in the Pakistan Tehreek-e-Insaf, attempted to file a blasphemy case against former Minister for Foreign Affairs Khawaja Asif for allegedly saying "Islam and all religions are equal" in a speech to Pakistan's National Assembly.
2020	On 29 July, Tahir Naseem, an American citizen from Illinois, was shot dead in a courtroom in Peshawar after allegedly claiming to be the messiah and a prophet. He was lured from the United States in 2018 by Facebook users who challenged him to a religious debate, but Naseem was jailed upon arriving in Pakistan. The United States Department of State quickly condemned the attack, urging Pakistan to reform its blasphemy laws and court system.
2020	In September, Asif Pervaiz, a Christian man, was sentenced to death by a Lahore court for sending a "blasphemous" message to his former work supervisor in 2013. Pervaiz said that his supervisor had tried to convert him to Islam, which he refused to do; however, the court rejected his testimony.
2021	In September, a court in Lahore sentenced Salma Tanveer, a school principal, to death for allegedly distributing photocopies of her writings denying the finality of prophethood and claimed herself as a prophet. She had initially been arrested on 3 September 2013.
2021	On 25 November, four Muslim men were charged with blasphemy for arguing with a imam while requesting to allow a funeral announcement from the village mosque for a Christian neighbour.
2021	On 28 November, a police station in Khyber Pakhtunkhwa was burned down by a mob after the police there refused to hand over a mentally-unstable blasphemy suspect.
2021	On 3 December, Priyantha Kumara, a Buddhist Sri Lankan factory manager in Sialkot, was tortured and burnt to death on the street by a mob of Muslims after he was accused of desecrating posters bearing Muhammad's name.
2022	On 8 February, a Hindu teacher, Nautan Lal, was sentenced to life imprisonment by a local court in Sindh for blasphemy. Lal was arrested in September 2019 following the posting of a video on social media in which a student claimed that Lal had committed blasphemy against Muhammed.
2022	On 12 February, a mentally unstable man was beaten to death by a mob of over 300 in Punjab after a mosque custodian accused him of desecrating the Quran. The police attempted to take custody of the man, but were pelted by stones and forced to retreat. Three police officers were injured; police arrested about 80 men in connection with the killing.
2022	On 8 August, Zahid Mahmood a property dealer in Gujranwala accused for blasphemy for participating in a Christian religious event and speaking against Islam.very next day mob attacked his office but he managed to escape. The mob filed a police case against him and demanded his arrest.
2023	On 4 February, Wikipedia was blocked in Pakistan after failing to remove undisclosed "blasphemous content." The Pakistan Telecommunication Authority (PTA) gave the Wikimedia Foundation a 48-hour deadline to remove the offending material, which was reportedly ignored. The ban was lifted on 7 February by order of Prime Minister Shehbaz Sharif following widespread criticism. Sharif also authorized the creation of a committee to review and offer alternative technical solutions for dealing with objectionable online content.
2023	On 11 February, Muhammad Waris, a Muslim man, was lynched in the city of Nankana Sahib by an angry mob after having been arrested by police on the charge of blasphemy. In footage of the incident posted to social media, hundreds of people surrounded the police station where Waris was being held. He was then dragged through the streets, stripped of his clothes, and beaten to death with metal rods and sticks.
2023	On 17 April, (Note: Timeline as per Dawn: alleged incident happened on April 15, arrested in Upper Kohistan district on April 16, Lodged the FIR on April 17) a Chinese transport supervisor employed at the Dasu Dam in northern Pakistan was accused of disrespecting Islam by his Pakistani transport drivers after allegedly admonishing them for delaying in reporting to work after their prayer time during the month of Ramadan. About 400 local residents then gathered to protest after the labourers accused the engineer of uttering disrespectful comments. For his safety, the accused Chinese man was transported to a police station in Komila and flown thereafter to Abbottabad. The police arrested the Chinese supervisor after filing an FIR against him in accordance with Section 295-C of the Pakistani Penal Code. The FIR also referenced Section 7 of the Anti-Terrorism Act. The Chinese man was subsequently released on bail, with the regional police chief stating that the case may only be a misunderstanding. Such bail is exceptional in Pakistan, where judges usually postpone blasphemy cases for many years, worrying about reprisals.
2023	On 6 May, Maulana Nigar Alam, a local Muslim religious leader, was killed by an angry mob at a political rally in the village of Sawaldher in Mardan district after being accused of blasphemy. Tehreek-e-Insaf organized the demonstration as a show of support for the country's judiciary, and Alam was invited to speak. However, while offering a prayer at the end of the event, Alam allegedly made an blasphemous remark, leading rallygoers to attack him. The police locked him inside a nearby shop for protection, but the mob broke down the door, dragged Alam out, and beat him to death with batons. A local jirga later determined that the lynching was illegal and un-Islamic, and that the perpetrators must pay 4.5 million rupees in blood money to Alam's family.
2023	On 5 August, Abdul Rauf Baloch, an English teacher, was killed by unidentified gunmen in the city of Turbat in southern Balochistan following accusations of blasphemy from some of his students. Rauf, who denied the allegations, was on his way to explain his position to a jirga of over 100 ulema when he was murdered. On 8 August, protestors at a rally organized by the Baloch Yakjehti Committee (Note: Also known as the Baloch Solidarity Committee (BSC)) condemned Rauf's murder and accused the jirga of being involved in some way. On the same night as the demonstration, Sameer Baloch, Rauf's brother, and his wife, Hani Baloch, were abducted by unidentified armed men from their home in the city of Iranshahr in Iran. The bodies of the couple were later found with signs that they had been tortured. The connection, if any, between their deaths and that of Rauf are unknown.
2023	On 16 August, an armed mob of Muslims set fire to at least four churches and several homes in Jaranwala in eastern Punjab following accusations that two Christian men had desecrated the Quran. The crowd, which numbered in the thousands, were reportedly led by clerics and included members of the far-right Islamic extremist party Tehreek-e-Labbaik Pakistan. Akmal Bhatti, Chairman of the Minorities Alliance Pakistan, accused the government and local administration of failing to protect Christian residents. In response to the attack, a spokesperson for Amnesty International stated that "the authorities in Pakistan must immediately address the climate of impunity around violence against religious minorities" and that "the vicious mob attacks are just the latest manifestation of the threat of vigilante violence which anyone can face in Pakistan after a blasphemy accusation." The police, who were accused of inaction during the attacks by some eyewitnesses, later arrested over 120 people for their involvement in the unrest.
2024	On March 8, a local court in the city of Gujranwala sentenced a 22-year-old student to death and a 17-year-old to life imprisonment (Note: Under Pakistani law, those below the age of 18 cannot be sentenced to death.) for having shared blasphemous material through WhatsApp.
2024	In May, Sargodha police successfully rescued a man and his family from an enraged mob over an alleged incident. The man had to be hospitalized and a family shop and home were damaged with fire set by the mob.
2024	On June 20, a tourist visitor from Sialkot, Punjab Pakistan was killed by enraged mob due to an alleged desecration incident at Madyan in the Swat district. Reuters report says that some graphic videos of the incident were verified to them by police where in, the body of victim was pulled through the streets and then set on the fire. Even the concerned police station was set on fire by the mob.
2024	On September 19, a Christian woman was sentenced to death under Section 295 of the Pakistan Penal Code (PPC) and Section 11 of Peca. Additionally, a fine of Rs 100,000 was imposed. She was accused of a blasphemous post she allegedly made on social media back in September 2020.
2024	In September, Dr. Shah Nawaz Kunbhar, a doctor, working in the town of Umerkot in southern Pakistan was accused of blasphemy on Facebook. The post that led to accusation was supposedly from an old, hacked account associated with the accused. The clerics then led violent protests in the area, attacking police stations and burning police vehicles. On assurances by the authorities that a chance would be given to prove his innocence, Dr. Shah surrendered to the police, but he was subsequently shot dead in a fake staged shootout on September 19. The provincial interior minister admitted to the extrajudicial killing a week later. In early October, it came to light that at least four policemen were involved in the killing namely Hidyatullah Narejo, Nadir Arain, Qadir and Farman. They were subsequently produced in an Anti-Terrorism Court.
2025	Muhammad Habib, a resident of Lahore, privately criticized the blasphemy law during a conversation with his cousin in January 2025. His cousin later reported this to a religious leader, who issued a fatwa against him. Following the fatwa, a social media campaign was launched, and his family began receiving death threats. Currently, he is outside the country seeking protection from the government. However, the government is demanding that he return and present himself in person.

Kamran Suleiman Ghaya was accused of committing blasphemy under section 295-C Pakistan Penal Code 1860, however after contested trial was acquitted by the trial court. Barrister S. M. Zulkufil Haider represented the accused, who as per his statement to the court was walking down road and a car splashed water onto him which led to a verbal altercation and the complainant started beating him, as the crowd gathered the complainant alleged that the accused had committed blasphemy. Though after the trial and his acquittal the accused has left the Karachi city. https://www.thenews.com.pk/print/1316638-man-acquitted-in-blasphemy-case-due-to-doubtful-testimony

== See also ==
- Apostasy in Islam
- Freedom of religion in Pakistan
- Islam in Pakistan
- Islamization in Pakistan
- Judiciary of Pakistan
- Pakistan National Commission for Minorities
- Pakistan Penal Code
- Religion in Pakistan
- Religious discrimination in Pakistan
- Sectarian violence in Pakistan
- Women related laws in Pakistan
