= Jonah (disambiguation) =

Jonah is a prophet described in the scriptures of Abrahamic religions, primarily in the Book of Jonah, as having been swallowed by a large fish.

Jonah may also refer to:

== Film and television ==
- Jonah: A VeggieTales Movie, a 2002 American animated film
- Jonah (TV series) a 1962 Australian historical drama series
- Jonah (1982 miniseries), an Australian miniseries based on the Louis Stone novel (see below)
- Jonah (2019 miniseries), a New Zealand biographical miniseries about Jonah Lomu

== Literature ==
- Jonah (comics), a character in The Beano
- Jonah (Goodman play), a 1942 play and musical by Paul Goodman
- Jonah (novel), a 1911 novel by Louis Stone
- Jonah (opera), a 1950 opera by Jack Beeson
- Jonah (poetry collection), a 2005 book by Peter Porter
- Jonah (Romeril musical), a 1985 musical by John Romeril
- Jonah, a 1917 poetry collection by Aldous Huxley
- Jo Nah, or Ultra Boy, a DC Comics superhero
- "Jonah" ("Jonas" in French), a 1966 short story by Gérard Klein.

== Music ==
- Jonah (musical), a 1985 Australian musical by John Romeril and Alan John
- "Jonah" (Breathe song), 1987
- "Jonah" (Kanye West song), 2021

== People ==
- Jonah (given name)

== Places ==
- Jenah or Jonah, a city in Iran
- Jonah, Texas, US
- Jonah Field, a large natural gas field in Sublette County, Wyoming, US

== Other uses ==
- Jonah (Lorenzetto), a 1520 marble sculpture by Lorenzetto
- JONAH (Jews Offering New Alternatives for Healing), a Jewish organization providing conversion therapy
- Book of Jonah, in the Hebrew Bible
- "Jonah", a term used among sailors for passengers who are bad luck, especially clergymen

== See also ==
- Jona (disambiguation)
- Jonas (disambiguation)
- Yonah (disambiguation)
- Yonas (disambiguation)
- Yunus (disambiguation)
