= Tahira Abdullah =

Pakistani activist

- طاہرہ عبداللہ
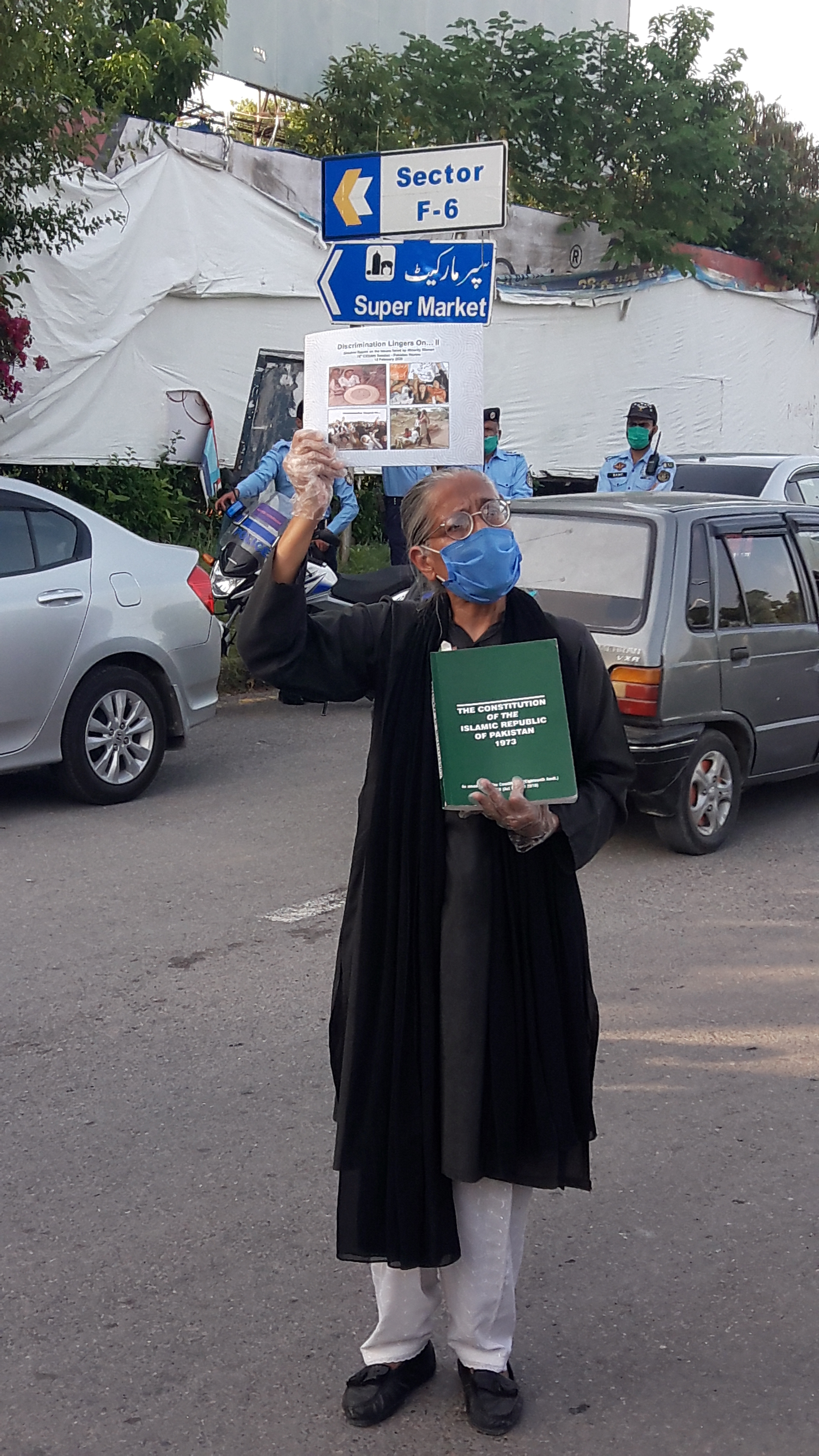
- Tahira Abdullah protesting in front of National Press Club, Islamabad
- Born: Tahira Abdullah c. 1953
- Occupations: Economic development practitioner, researcher
- Known for: Women's rights activist, humanitarian volunteer, peace activist

Tahira Abdullah (Urdu: طاہرہ عبداللہ, born c. 1953 ) is a Pakistani human rights activist, women's rights activist, social scientist and supporter of gender equality. She is based in Islamabad.

In 2009, Abdullah was arrested in Islamabad during her participation in the movement for the restoration of an independent judiciary.

Abdullah works on a voluntary basis for numerous trusts, civil society organisations, non-profits, policy groups, and academic bodies. She is a strong supporter of extremism-free education and easy access for women from rural areas. She has spoken about "opening up spaces for human rights defenders", in response to the murder of Rashid Rehman (lawyer for Junaid Hafeez) in 2014.

In 2014، she opposed the actions of the Pakistan Electronic Media Regulatory Authority (Pemra) in closing down a private TV station for a fortnight for allegedly broadcasting blasphemous content; Abdullah's view was that "this is not the answer". In response to the Kasur child sexual abuse scandal she commented that "one child missing is one child too many".

== Works ==
- Co-author Suggestions on Women's Empowerment for Election Manifestos of Political Parties (Aurat Foundation, 2012)
- The situation of disabled children in Pakistan (UNICEF, 1981)
