= Yunus (surname) =

- Pronunciation: Arabic: [juːnus] Persian: [juːnes] Urdu: [juːnʊs]
- Gender: Male

Origin
- Origin: Hebrew
- Meaning: Dove; peaceful being, accomplishing, and a gift from God

Other names
- Related names: Jonah, Jonas, Joonas, Yonah, Janusz

Yunus is a surname, with the same origin and meaning as Yunus (given name).

Like the given name, there are several variant spellings.

== Notable people with this surname ==
- Adel Younis (died 1976), Egyptian jurist and politician
- Amin Younes (born 1993), German footballer
- Abdul Fatah Younis (1944–2011), senior military officer in Libya who defected to join the rebels of the 2011 Libyan civil war
- Fawaz Younis, Lebanese hijacker
- Gayyur Yunus (born 1948), Azerbaijani painter
- Glenn Younes, sports radio talk show host and update anchor
- Hadrat Yunus, the Prophet Jonah as mentioned in the Qur'an
- Ibn Yunus, 10th-century Egyptian mathematician and astronomer
- Imed Ben Younes (born 1974), Tunisian footballer
- Leyla Yunus, Azerbaijani human rights activist
- Lincoln Younes (born 1992), Australian actor
- Megat Yunus, Malaysian politician
- Mohammad Yunus (disambiguation), multiple people
- Mohammad Yunus Khalis, mujahideen commander of Afghanistan
- Monica Yunus, opera singer
- Muhammad Yunus, Bangladeshi banker, economist, and Nobel Peace Prize recipient
- Nadia Younes (1946–2003), Egyptian UN and WHO official
- Nussaibah Younis (born 1986), English international affairs consultant and novelist
- Samora Mohammad Yunis, Chief of Staff of the Ethiopian Army
- Waqar Younis, Pakistani cricketer
