= Mohammad Yunus =

Muhammad Yunus (born 1940) is the former chief advisor of Bangladesh, a Bangladeshi economist, founder of the Grameen Bank, and a Nobel Peace Prize laureate.

Mohammad Younus (or variants such as Mohammad, Mohammed, Muhammad and Yunus, Younis) may refer to:

- Mohammad Yunus (diplomat) (1916–2001), Indian ambassador
- Mohammad Yunus (Indian politician) (1884–1952), first prime minister (premier) of Bihar, India
- Muhammad Yunus (scholar) (1906–1992), Bangladeshi Islamic scholar
- Mohammad Yunus (umpire) (1915–1992), Indian cricket umpire
- Mohammad Yunus Khalis (c. 1919–2006), Afghan politician
- Muhammad Yunus Nawandish, former mayor of Kabul, Afghanistan
- Mohammad Yunus Saleem (1912–2004), Indian politician
- Yunus Qanuni (born 1957), Afghan politician
- Mohammad Yunus (academic), professor of economics at Rajshahi University, murdered in 2004
- Mohammad Yunus (Bangladeshi politician), Bangladesh Nationalist Party politician
- Talukder Mohammad Yunus (born 1952), Bangladeshi Awami League politician
- Mohammad Yunus Khan, Bangladesh Nationalist Party politician
- Muhamad Yunus (born 1988), Indonesian football coach

== See also ==
- Yunus Mohamed, South African lawyer and activist
- Mohammad Younis Khan (born 1977), Pakistani cricketer
- Mohammad Younus Shaikh (born 1952), Pakistani doctor and human rights activist
- Mohammad Younus Shaikh (author) (born 1965), Pakistani writer
- Muhammad Yunus Ibrahim, Trinidad and Tobago politician
- Yunus (disambiguation)
