= Jaele =

Jaele may refer to:

- Jaele Patrick (born 1988), Australian diver
- Younes Jaele (born 1962), Iranian businessman
- Dèbora e Jaéle (Deborah and Jael), opera by Pizzetti
