= Gesa Ederberg =

German female rabbi

Gesa Ederberg (born 1968 in Tübingen, Germany) is a German rabbi; she became the first female pulpit rabbi in Berlin in 2007 when she became the rabbi of the New Synagogue, Berlin (Oranienburger Strasse Synagogue) in the former East Berlin. Her installation as such was opposed by Berlin's senior Orthodox rabbi Yitzchak Ehrenberg.

She converted to Judaism in 1995. She was ordained by the Schechter Institute of Jewish Studies in Jerusalem in 2003. She established a Conservative Jewish beit midrash in Berlin. She was part of the 2006 founding of the European Rabbinical Assembly of Masorti/Conservative Rabbis.

As of 2013, she was the executive vice president of Masorti Europe and the rabbi of New Synagogue, Berlin.

The 2022 art exhibit “Holy Sparks”, shown among other places at the Dr. Bernard Heller Museum, featured art about twenty-four female rabbis who were firsts in some way; Yona Verwer created the artwork about Ederberg that was in that exhibit.

In 2026, she became the president of the Rabbinical Assembly, the first European-based rabbi to lead this global organization with over 1,600 members.

== Publications ==
- Knobloch, Charlotte; Brumlik, Micha; Ederberg, Gesa S. (2007). Wenn nicht jetzt, wann dann? Zur Zukunft des deutschen Judentums [If Not Now, When Then? On The Future of the German Jewry] (in German). Wilfried Köpke. Verlag Herder. ISBN 978-3451293955.
