= Killing of Tahir Naseem =

2020 fatal shooting of a Pakistani American

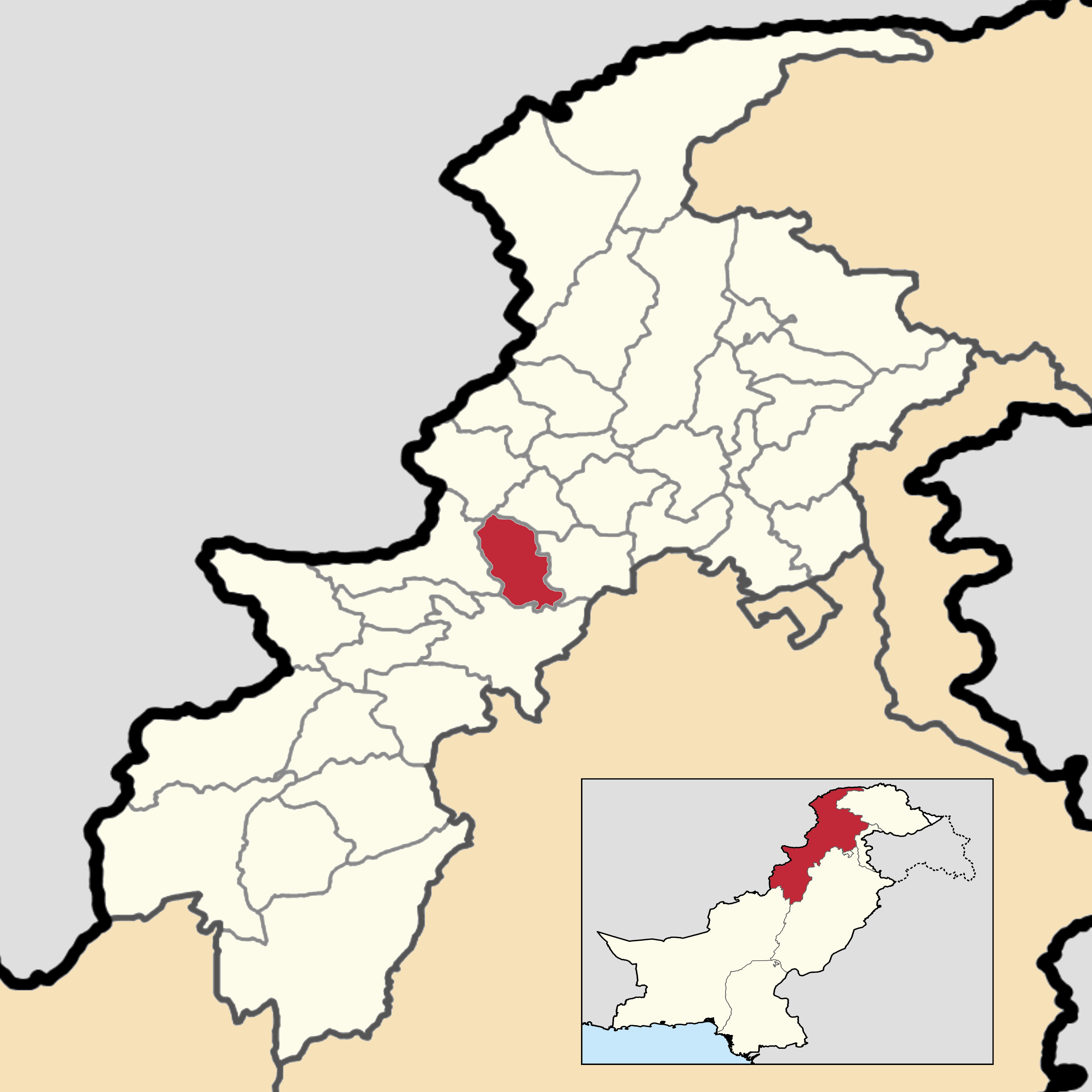
- Location of Peshawar District, within the province of Khyber Pakhtunkhwa
- Date: July 29, 2020; 5 years ago
- Time: c. 11:30 a.m. (PKT)
- Location: Peshawar, Pakistan
- Type: Homicide
- Participants: Tahir Naseem (deceased); Faisal Khan (shooter)

On 29 July 2020, Tahir Ahmed Naseem, an American citizen from Illinois, was shot and killed in a courtroom in Peshawar, Pakistan. Naseem, who had been in police custody since 2018, was accused of having committed blasphemy, a criminal offence under the Pakistan Penal Code.

== Background ==
Naseem was born in Peshawar, Pakistan. He was born into an Ahmadi family, but later converted to Sunni Islam. Naseem's family moved to the United States in the late 1970s when he was a teenager after the Constitution of Pakistan declared Ahmadis to be non-Muslims. He became a naturalised citizen.

According to the United States Department of State, Naseem was lured to Pakistan from his home in Illinois by individuals who then used Pakistan's blasphemy laws to entrap him. The U.S. Government had been providing consular assistance to Naseem and his family since his detention in 2018 and had called the attention of senior Pakistani officials to his case to prevent the type of act that eventually occurred.

== Incident ==
Naseem was shot 6 times by Faisal Khan, a 21-year old local resident. Naseem was a former member of the Ahmadi sect. According to the official spokesman for the Ahmadi community in Pakistan, Naseem had previously renounced his affiliation with the Ahmadi community and embraced Sunni Islam. His death spurred thousands in support of his killer to rally in Peshawar.

In September 2020, the Peshawar High Court had declared the prime accused a juvenile and ordered his trial be tried under the Juvenile Justice System Act, 2018. The prime accused, who was stated to be aged 17 years at the time, and the two co-accused in the case, cleric Wasiullah and a junior lawyer Tufail Zia were facing a trial inside the Central Prison Peshawar.

== See also ==
- Blasphemy in Pakistan
- List of blasphemy cases in Pakistan
- Pakistani Americans
