= Yunna =

Yunna may refer to:

- Yunna Morits (born 1937), Russian poet, poetry translator, and activist
- Ella Koon (born 1979), full name Ella Koon Yun-na, Hong Kong Cantopop singer and actress
- Yunna, a featured artist on the single "Makaroni" by Spankox
- Wael Yunna, also known as Wael Mikhael, journalist in Wael Mikhael incident

== See also ==
- Yunnan, Chinese province
- Younha (born Go Yun-ha, 1988), South Korean singer, written ユンナ in Japanese
- Yuma (disambiguation)
- Yuna (disambiguation)
- Yuuna (disambiguation)
