= Lynching of Muhammad Waris =

2023 killing of blasphemy suspect in Pakistan

- Location: Nankana Sahib District, Pakistan
- Date: 11 February 2023; 3 years ago
- Target: Muhammad Waris
- Attack type: Lynching
- Deaths: 1
- Victim: Muhammad Waris
- Motive: Suspicion of blasphemy

On 11 February 2023, blasphemy suspect Waris was lynched in Nankana Sahib District, Pakistan.

== Background ==
Blasphemy is a very serious crime in Pakistan, for which the maximum penalty is death. Pakistan has sentenced people convicted of blasphemy to death, although it has not executed any of them. Some people who were accused of blasphemy have been lynched, including Priyantha Kumara in Sialkot, Punjab, in 2021 and Mushtaq Ahmed in Tulamba, Punjab, in 2022. International and national human rights groups say that blasphemy accusations have often been used to intimidate religious minorities. In 2021, a mob burned down Mandani police station in Tangi Tehsil, Charsadda District, Peshawar Division, Khyber Pakhtunkhwa, intending to kill a blasphemy suspect who was being held there.

== Lynching ==
In 2019, a man named Waris was arrested for blasphemy. He was taken to the trial in the court of additional session judge of Nankana sahib Nadeem Tahir Syed but released because of no pure evidence. He remained in prison until mid-2022. On 11 February 2023 he was accused of desecrating a copy of the Quran. Some people reacted by attacking him. The police arrested Waris in Nankana Sahib District in Lahore Division, Punjab, and took him to Warburton police station. Later that day, a mob of hundreds stormed the police station and killed him, saying that they were punishing him for insulting the Quran.
