= Yono =

Yono may refer to:

- YONO, an integrated digital banking platform in India
- Yono, Saitama, a former city, now part of Saitama, Japan
  - Yono Station, a railway station
- Yono the Destroyer, a character in the television series Kim Possible
- Yono-class submarine

== See also ==
- Jonah (disambiguation)
