= New Synagogue (Berlin) =

Conservative synagogue in Berlin, Germany

- German: Neue Synagoge
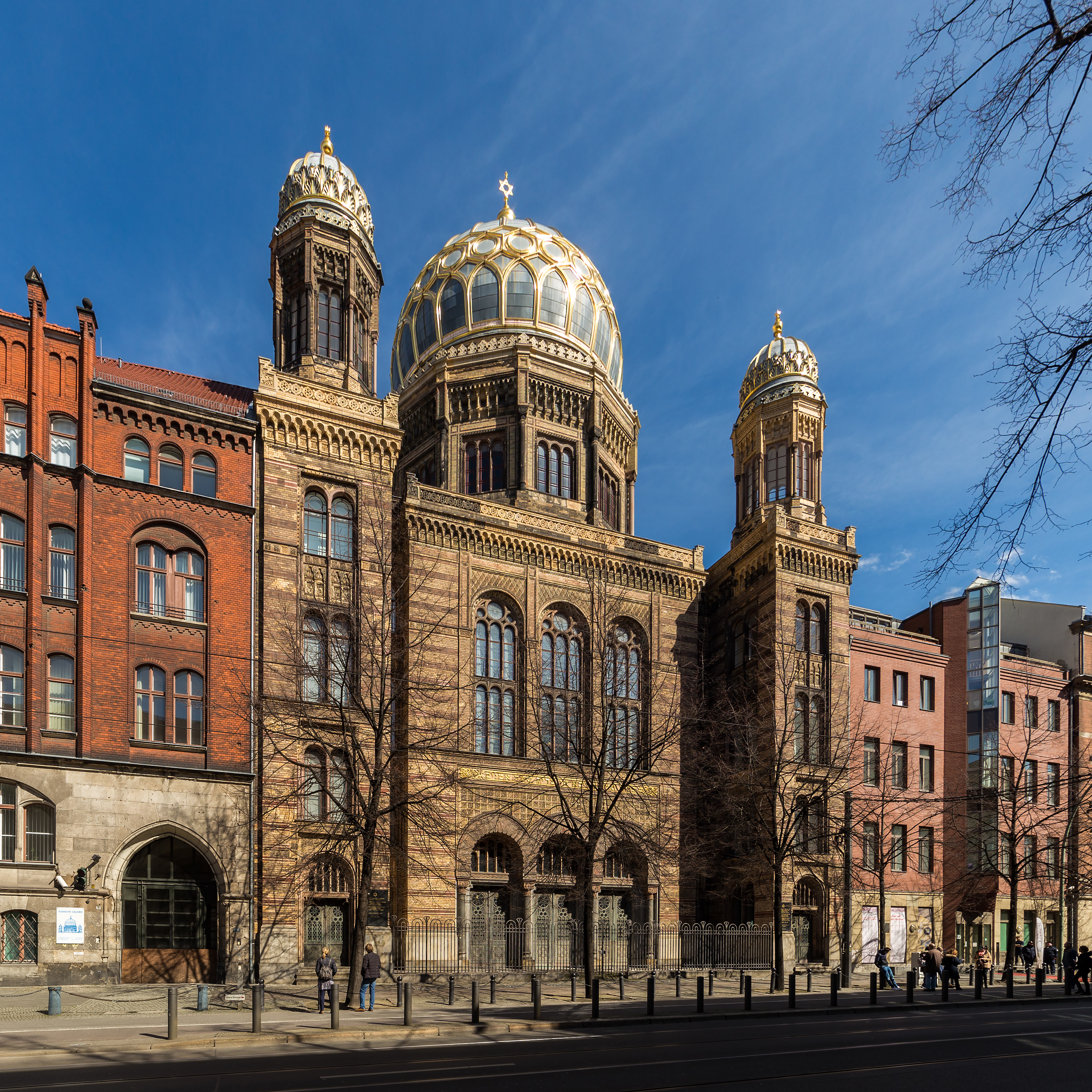
- The synagogue, in 2016

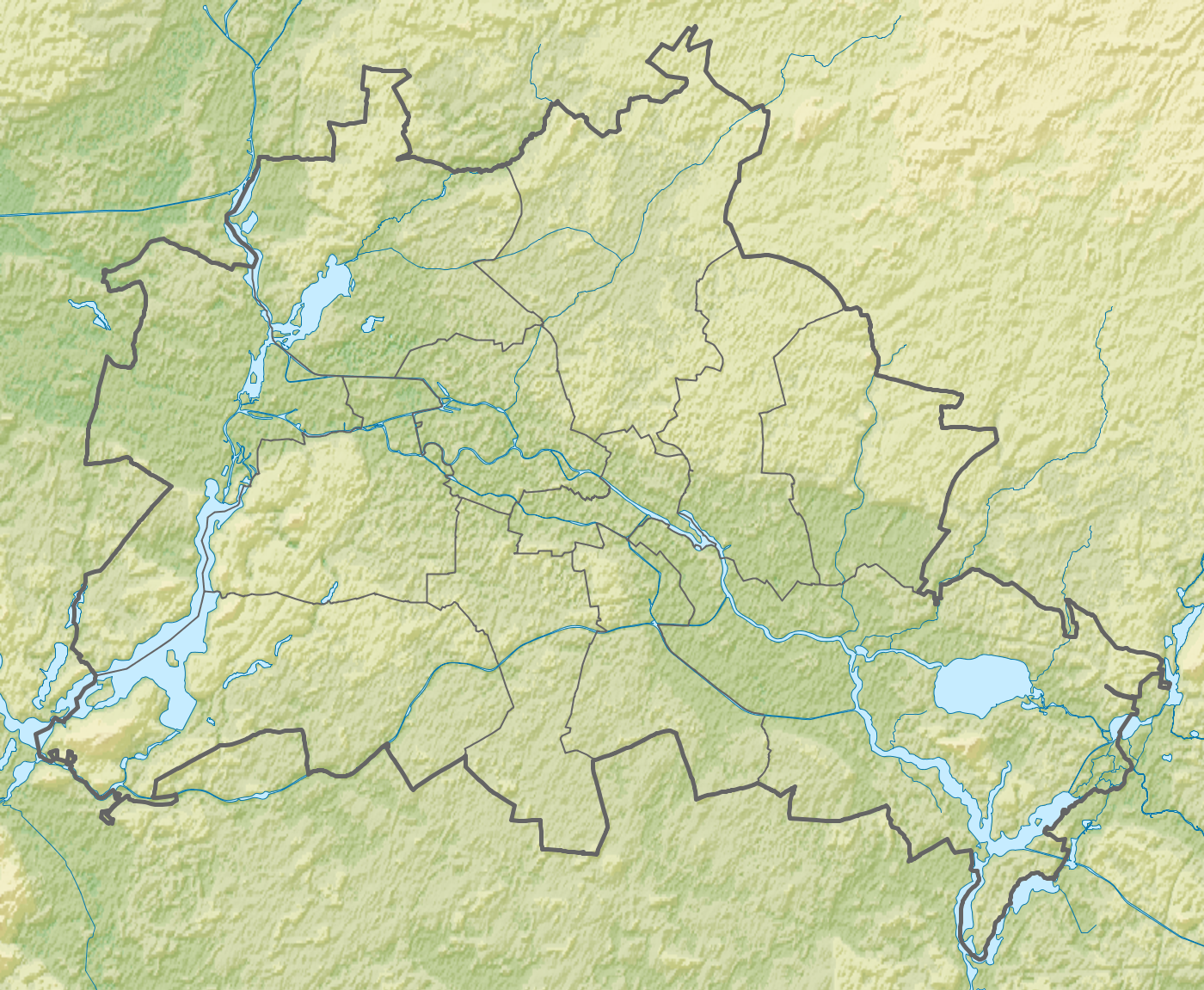
- Location of the synagogue in Berlin

Religion
- Affiliation: Conservative Judaism
- Rite: Nusach Ashkenaz
- Ecclesiastical or organisational status: Synagogue
- Leadership: Rabbi Gesa Ederberg
- Status: Active

Location
- Location: Oranienburger Straße 29–31, Berlin
- Country: Germany
- Coordinates: 52°31′29″N 13°23′40″E

Architecture
- Type: Synagogue architecture
- Style: Moorish Revival
- Groundbreaking: 1859
- Completed: 1866

Specifications
- Capacity: 3,200 seats
- Dome: Three

Website
- centrumjudaicum.de (in German)

The New Synagogue (German: Neue Synagoge) on Oranienburger Straße in Berlin is a mid-19th century synagogue built as the main place of worship for the city's Jewish community, succeeding the Old Synagogue which the community outgrew. Because of its Moorish style and resemblance to the Alhambra, the New Synagogue is an important architectural monument in Germany.

The building was designed by Eduard Knoblauch. Following Knoblauch's death in 1865, Friedrich August Stüler took responsibility for the majority of its construction as well as for its interior arrangement and design. It was inaugurated in the presence of Count Otto von Bismarck, then Minister President of Prussia, in 1866. One of the few synagogues to survive Kristallnacht, it was badly damaged prior to and during World War II and subsequently much was demolished; the present building on the site is a reconstruction of the ruined street frontage with its entrance, dome and towers, along with only a few rooms behind. It is truncated before the point where the main hall of the synagogue began.

== Building ==
The front of the building, facing Oranienburger Straße, is polychrome brickwork, richly ornamented with sculpted bricks and terracotta, accented by coloured glazed bricks. Beyond the entrance, the building's alignment changes to mesh with pre-existing structures. The synagogue's main dome, with its gilded ribs, is an eye-catching landmark.

The central dome is flanked by two smaller pavilion-like domes on the two side-wings. Beyond the façade was the front hall and the main hall with 3,000 seats. Due to the unfavourable alignment of the property, the building's design required adjustment along a slightly turned axis.

The Neue Synagoge is also a monument of early iron construction. The new building material was visible in the outside columns, as well as in the dome's construction. Iron was also a core component for the now-lost floor structure of the main hall.

== History ==
The New Synagogue was built to serve the growing Jewish population in Berlin, in particular, immigrants from the East. It was the largest synagogue in Germany at the time, seating 3,000 people. The building housed public concerts, including a violin concert with Albert Einstein in 1930. With an organ and a choir, the religious services reflected the liberal developments in the Jewish community of the time.

One of the concerts that occurred here was a Sabbath evening service composed by Jacob Weinberg (1879–1956) and conducted by esteemed conductor Chemjo Winawer. Winawer had been looking for a religious piece to conduct here and he discovered Jacob Weinberg's work. According to the Jewish Telegraph Service article of 26 October 1934, the Sabbath eve liturgy was performed in front of a packed house of 3,000 in this synagogue on 25 October 1936. It was met with an enthusiastic ovation. The work comprises twelve different musical compositions, all based on the prayers recited during the Sabbath Eve religious service. The collaboration was such a success that Winawer collaborated with Jacob Weinberg again on 5 September 1938 when he conducted Weinberg's prize-winning opera "The Pioneers of Palestine" (aka "Hechalutz" or "Die Chalutzim"), the first opera on Hebrew/Israeli themes (composed in 1924). It was performed on 5 September 1938, at another Berlin synagogue on Prinzregentenstrasse, as part of the Kulturbund. The Kulturbund was a program that permitted performances of Jewish works in Germany as the Nazi regime escalated. The Nazis did not allow Jewish works to be performed in regular concert halls attended by Aryans, but it did allow such works to be performed in other spaces such as synagogues. It was administered by Kurt Singer. The New Synagogue (the Neue Synagogue on Oranienburger Street) survived Kristallnacht, the pogrom of 9–10 November 1938. Unfortunately the equally-grand synagogue on Prinzregentenstrasse did not survive Kristallnacht. It was plundered of its valuables, torched, and ultimately destroyed; only a bronze plaque at the site remains of this magnificent structure. Both Jacob Weinberg and Chemjo Winawer went to the United States to avoid Nazi persecution.

During Kristallnacht (9 November 1938), a Nazi mob broke into the Neue Synagoge, desecrated the Torah scrolls, smashed the furniture, piled up such contents as would burn in the synagogue interior, and set fire to them. Lieutenant Otto Bellgardt, the police officer of the local police precinct on duty that night, arrived on the scene in the early morning of 10 November and ordered the arsonists to disperse. He said the building was a protected historical landmark and drew his pistol, declaring that he would uphold the law requiring its protection. This allowed the fire brigade to enter and extinguish the fire before it could spread to the fabric of the building, and the synagogue was saved from destruction. Senior Lieutenant Wilhelm Krützfeld, head of the local police precinct, and Bellgardt's superior, later covered up for him. Berlin's police commissioner Graf Helldorf only verbally reprimanded Krützfeld for shielding his subordinate and, partly in consequence, Krützfeld has often mistakenly been identified as the rescuer of the New Synagogue. (Note: Scheer explained that Knobloch popularised the story that Wilhelm Krützfeld rescued the New Synagogue. Knobloch learned about the rescue from the report of an eyewitness, the late Hans Hirschberg. Hirschberg, who was a boy in 1938, observed the fire with his father, the tailor Siegmund Hirschberg. He recalled that his father and a police officer, who was one of his father's clients and whom Hans assumed to be the head of the police precinct, got into a conversation, while the police officer was supervising the work of the fire brigade, about their experiences in the same sector of the front in World War I. When Knobloch did research for his book Der beherzte Reviervorsteher about the rescue of the New Synagogue, he learned that the head of the precinct was Krützfeld and identified him as the officer. But Krützfeld was never conscripted in that war. After Knobloch's book appeared another neighbour, Inge Held, Hirschberg, and Hirschberg's sister in Israel all confirmed that the rescuer was Otto Bellgardt.)

The New Synagogue, like the synagogue in Rykestrasse, remained intact and was subsequently repaired by the congregation, who continued to use it as synagogue until 1940. Besides being used for prayers, the main hall was also used for concerts and lectures, since Jews were banned from other venues. The main prayer hall was last used by the congregation for a concert on Sunday, 31 March 1940. The concert was the last of a series of benefit concerts in aid of the Jüdisches Winterhilfswerk (Jewish Winter Aid Endowment), a charity helping poor Jews, who had been excluded from government benefits. On 5 April 1940 the Jüdisches Nachrichtenblatt was required to announce that services in the New Synagogue would not be held until further notice; this was the usual way Nazi prohibitions were publicised. Congregants were requested to evacuate their belongings from their shelves in the prayer hall by Monday 8 April. (Note: In the original: "Die Platzinhaber werden hierdurch aufgefordert, ihre Gebetutensilien bis Montag, den 8. April, mittags 12 Uhr, aus den Pulten herauszunehmen." Quote from 'Jüdisches Nachrichtenblatt'.) The main hall was then seized by the Heeresbekleidungsamt III (uniform department No. III) of the Heer (German Army), who used it to store uniforms.

The Rykestraße Synagogue was closed and seized by the Heer a week later. The Jewish Community of Berlin continued to use the office rooms in the front section of New Synagogue, including the Repräsentantensaal (hall of the assembly of elected community representatives) below the golden dome. The congregation occasionally held prayers in this hall until September 1942, when it had to evacuate the front section as well. During World War II the New Synagogue was heavily damaged; it was completely burned after Allied bombing during the Battle of Berlin, a series of British air raids lasting from 18 November 1943 until 25 March 1944. The strike on the New Synagogue was recorded in the Berlin police commissioner's bomb damage reports, regularly issued after attacks, for the raid on the night of 22–23 November 1943. (Note: It says: "Heeresbekleidungsamt III Bln. C2, Oranienburger Str. 30 Totalschaden.")

The building to the left from the New Synagogue, and the second one to the right at Oranienburger Straße 28, (Note: Odd and even numbers are on the same side of the street) also belonged to Berlin's Jewish Community. These buildings survived the war intact, and it was in the latter that surviving Jews formally reconstituted the Jüdische Gemeinde zu Berlin, Berlin's mainstream Jewish congregation, in 1946. In the immediate post-war years, there were the anti-Semitic manifestations in Czechoslovakia (Slánský trial, November 1952), arrests and interrogations of Jews in East Berlin and East Germany (January 1953), and the Soviet Doctors' plot (started on 13 January 1953). Members of the Jüdische Gemeinde in East Berlin, hoping to spare themselves from further persecution, formed a new provisional executive board competent only for the eastern sector, and thus divided the Jewish community into an eastern and a western one (21 January 1953).

In 1958 the Jewish Community of East Berlin was prompted by East Berlin authorities to demolish the ruined rear sections of their building, including the soot-blackened ruin of the main prayer hall, leaving only the less-destroyed front section. The damaged, but mostly preserved, central dome on top of the front section was also torn down in the 1950s. East Berlin's Jewish Community, impoverished and small after the Holocaust (Shoah) and the flight of many surviving members from anti-Semitism, saw no chance to restore it.

It was not until the collapse of the Berlin Wall in 1989 that reconstruction of the front section began. From 1988 to 1993, the structurally intact parts of the building close to the street, including the façade, the dome, and some rooms behind were restored as the "Centrum Judaicum" ("Jewish Center"); the main sanctuary was not restored. In May 1995, a small synagogue congregation was reestablished using the former women's wardrobe room. The area behind the restored frontage, formerly the main prayer hall, remains an empty space, and is open to visitors.

Together with the New Synagogue, the whole Spandauer Vorstadt neighbourhood (lit. "suburb towards Spandau", often confused with the Scheunenviertel) experienced a revival. Chic restaurants and boutiques opened up in the area, catering to an increasingly bourgeois clientele.

In 2007 Gesa Ederberg became the first female pulpit rabbi in Berlin when she became the rabbi of the New Synagogue. Her installation was opposed by Berlin's senior Orthodox rabbi, Yitzchak Ehrenberg.

== Today ==
Jewish services are now held again in the New Synagogue; the congregation is the Berlin community's sole Masorti synagogue. Most of the building, however, houses offices and a museum. The dome may also be visited. The New Synagogue held a significant restitution ceremony in October 2026, marking the return of two ancient Jewish ritual textiles that the Nazis had taken from the congregation during the 1938 Kristallnacht pogrom. The artifacts, a Torah wimple and a parochet (Torah ark curtain), were acquired after World War II by a Holocaust survivor who exchanged goods for them. Temple Chai, a synagogue in Phoenix, Arizona, kept them for many years. The congregation willingly returned the artifacts to the Berlin Jewish community for permanent exhibition at the Centrum Judaicum after Temple Chai's building was deconsecrated.

== Gallery ==
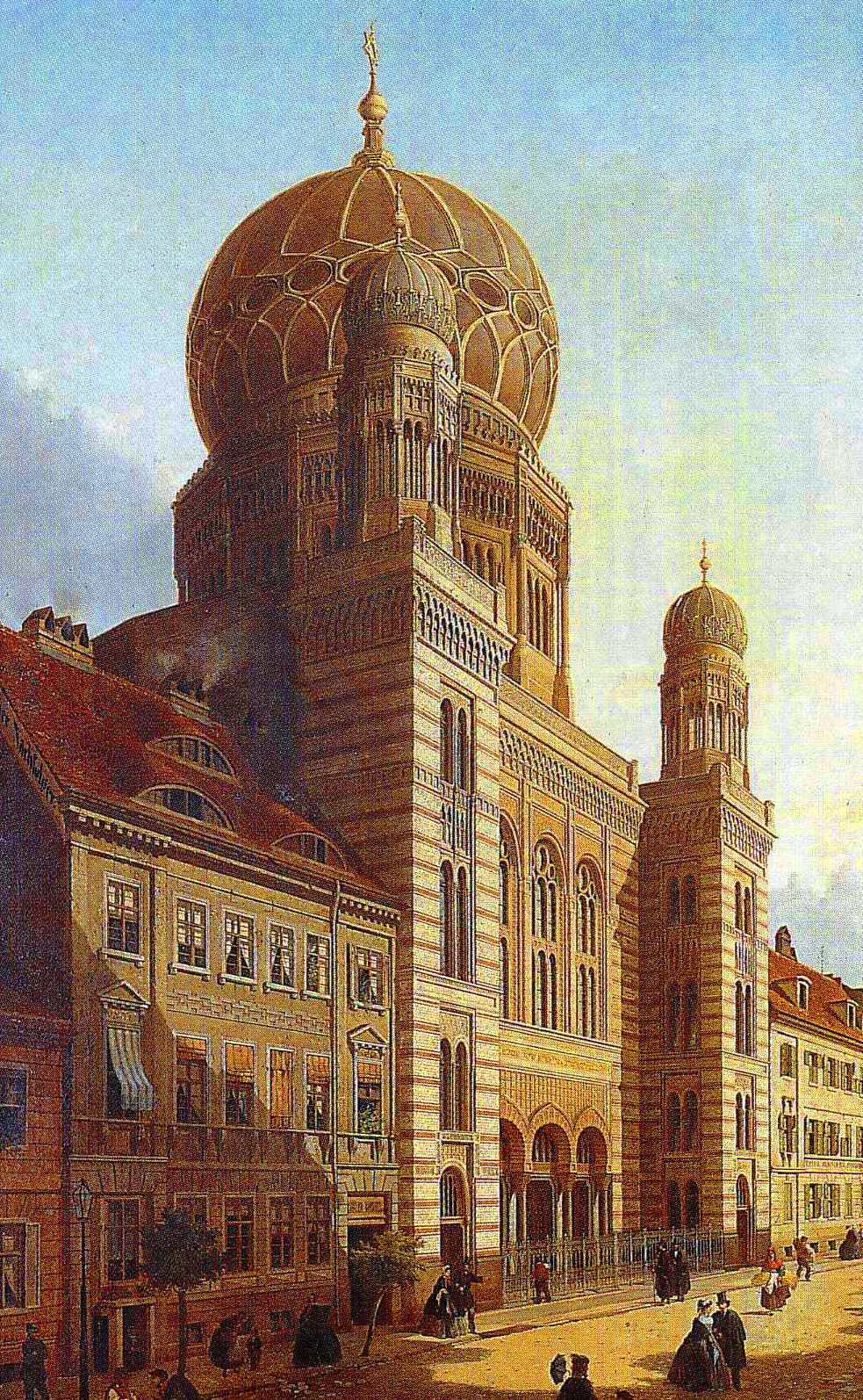
New Synagogue, Berlin, 1865: now at the Märkisches Museum

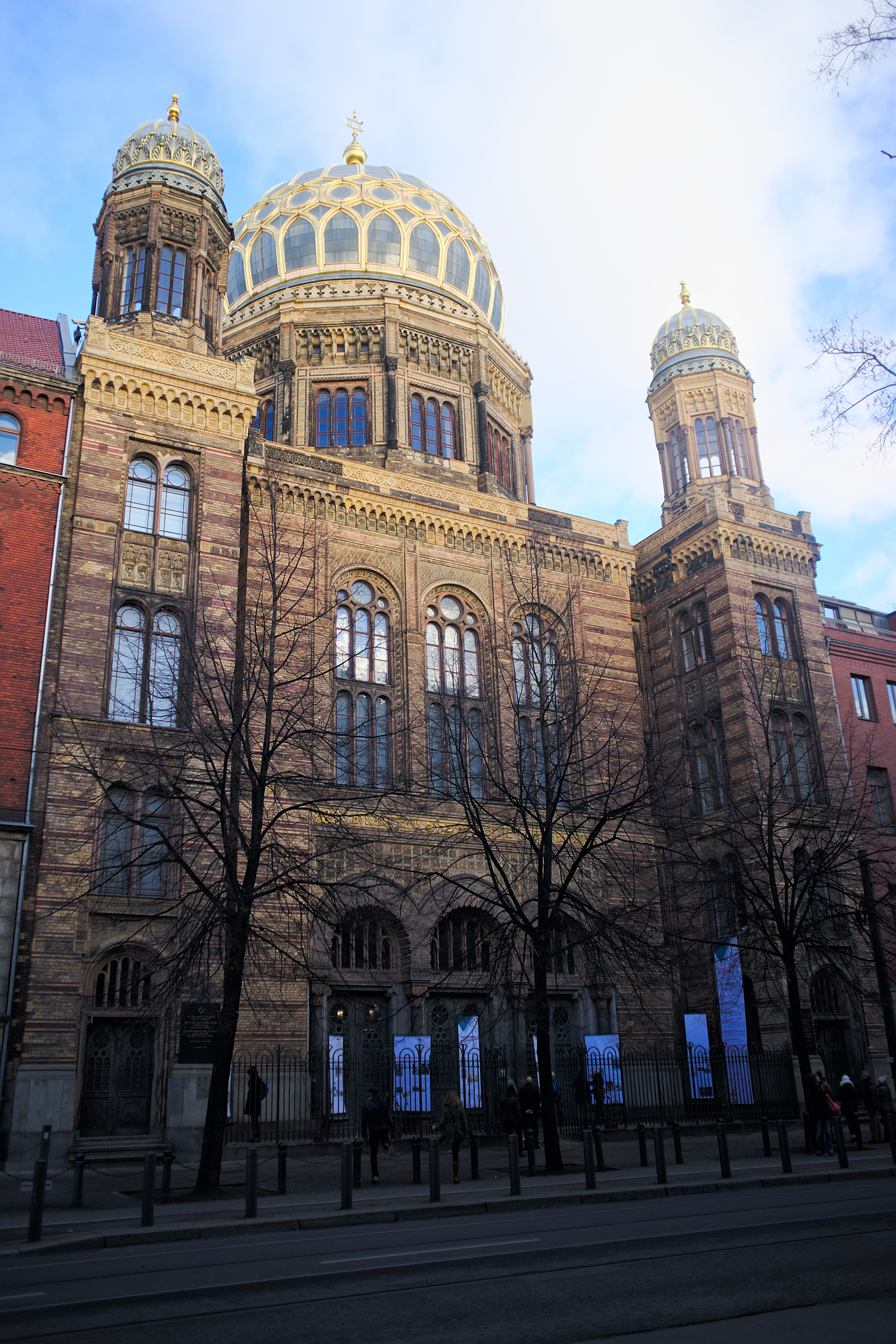
The New Synagogue in current times

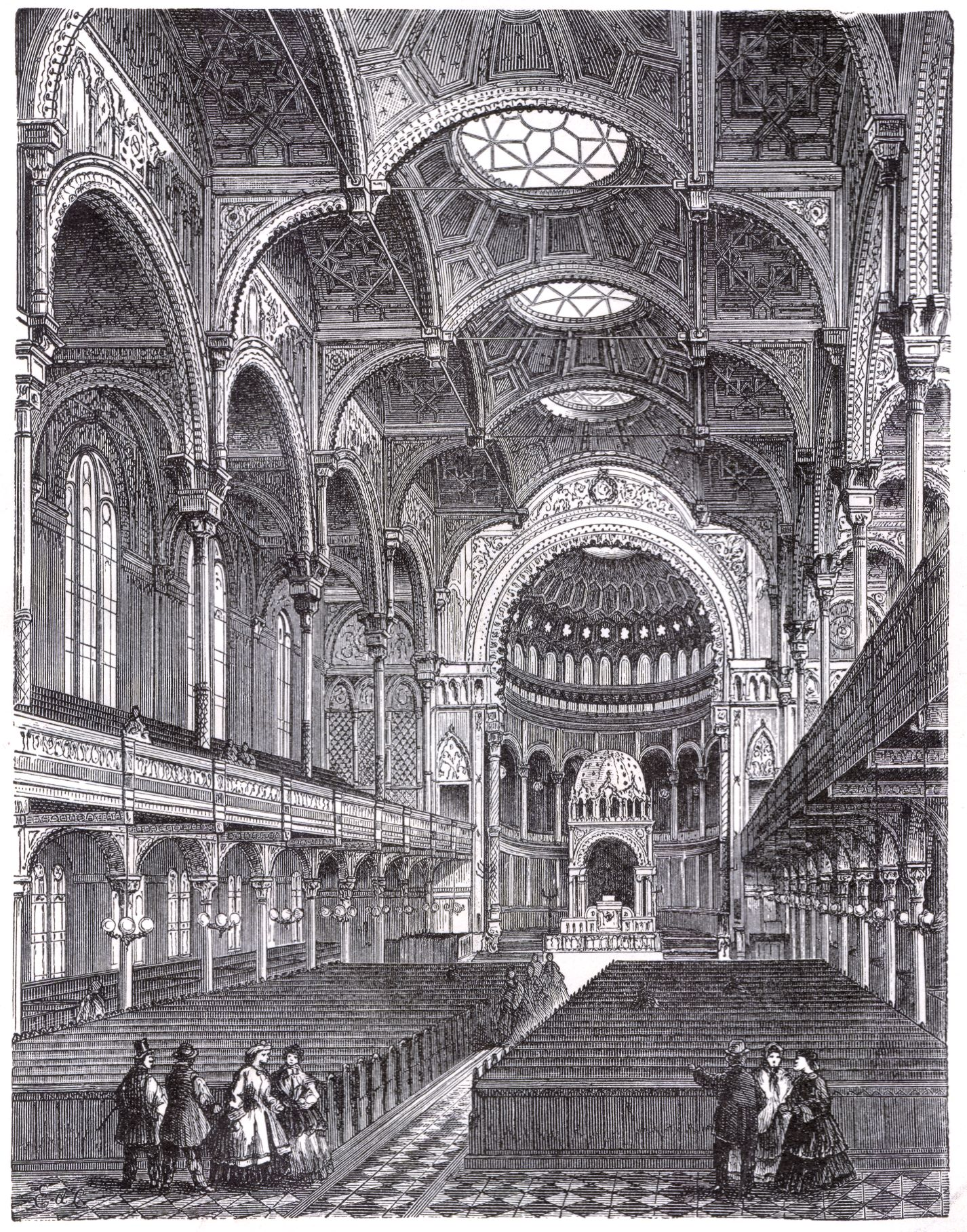
Interior view from Berlin und seine Bauten, published by Wilhelm Ernst & Sohn 1896

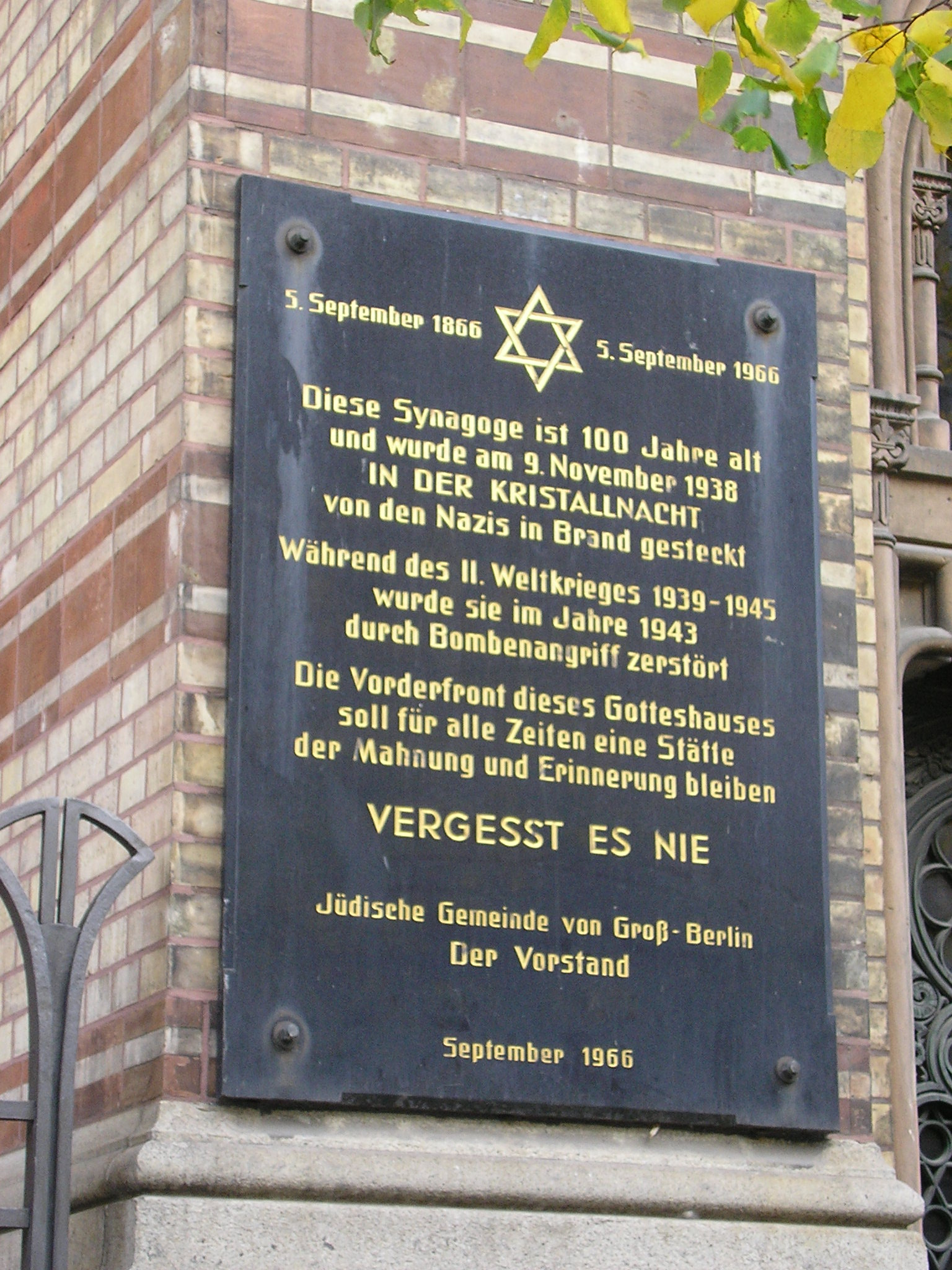
The plaque on the front of the Neue Synagogue, outlining the building's history

== See also ==
- History of the Jews in Germany
- List of synagogues in Germany (in German)
- Religion in Berlin
- Louis Lewandowski – choirmaster at the Neue Synagogue and composer of sacred music
