= Yona (disambiguation) =

Yona is a Pali word used to refer to speakers of Greek.

Yona may also refer to:

== Places ==
- Yona (Namibe), a commune of Angola
- Yona, Burkina Faso, a village in Bana Department, Balé Province, Burkina Faso
- Yona, Guam, a village on Guam
- Yona, Russia, a rural locality (a selo) in Murmansk Oblast, Russia
- Çaybeyi, Oğuzeli, formerly known as Yona, a rural neighborhood in Gaziantep Province, Turkey

== People ==
- Jonah, Biblical prophet
- Yona Bogale, first leader of the Ethiopian Jewish community in Israel
- Daniel Yona, Tanzanian politician
- Yona Ettlinger, Israeli clarinetist
- Yona Fischer, Israeli art curator (1932–2022)
- Yona Friedman, Hungarian-born French architect
- Yona Harvey, American poet (born 1974)
- Yona Kesse, Israeli politician
- Yona Knight-Wisdom, Jamaican diver
- Yona Kosashvili, Georgian chess grandmaster
- Yoná Magalhães, Brazilian actress
- Yona Metzger, chief Ashkenazi rabbi of Israel
- Yona Reiss, American rabbi
- Yona Rozenkier, Israeli actor, writer and filmmaker
- Yona Sabar, Iraqi linguist
- Yona Wallach, Israeli poet
- Yona Yahav, Israeli lawyer and politician
- Yona Verwer, Dutch-born visual artist

== Entertainment ==
- Yona, a character in the My Little Pony: Friendship Is Magic series

== Other uses ==
- Yona of the Dawn, Japanese manga series
- Yona (film), a 2014 Israeli film
- "Yona", the word for "hedgehog" in the Lapine language of the novel Watership Down

== See also ==
- Iona (disambiguation)
- Jona (disambiguation)
- Yona-Kit, American math rock quartet (1994)
- Yona Yona Penguin, 2009 Japanese animated film
- Kfar Yona, town in Sharon Subdistrict, Center District, Israel
- Akatsuki no Yona, a manga and anime series.
