= Yonas (disambiguation) =

Yonas was a nineteenth-century Ethiopian emperor. Other notable people with the name include:

- Yonas (rapper), American hip hop artist
- Yonas Beyene, Ethiopian archaeologist
- Yonas Fissahaye (born 1991), Eritrean racing cyclist
- Yonas Kifle (born 1977), Eritrean runner
- Yonas Kinde (born 1980), Ethiopian track and field athlete
- Yonas Malede (born 1999), Israeli footballer
- Yonas Mekuria, first officer of hijacked Ethiopian Airlines Flight 961
- Yonas Monteyunas (born 1940), Soviet rower
- Johnny Ramensky (born Yonas Ramanauckas, 1905–1972), British criminal

== See also ==
- Jonas (disambiguation)
- Yona (disambiguation)
- Yunus (given name), includes other spellings
