= 2010 European terror plot =

Alleged foiled series of terrorist attacks

The 2010 European terror plot was an alleged al-Qaeda plot to launch "commando-style" terror attacks on the United Kingdom, France, and Germany. The existence of the plot was revealed in late September 2010 after it was disrupted by intelligence agencies. Thought to be ordered by Osama bin Laden himself, the plot led to an unprecedented increase in drone attacks in Pakistan and travel advisories from several countries to their citizens to be careful while traveling in Europe.

== Plot ==
The existence of the plot was revealed by several media sources including Sky News on 28 September 2010. Intelligence officials stated that the plot was ordered by Osama bin Laden himself. The plan was to launch attacks similar to the 2008 Mumbai attacks. It was discovered and disrupted by the combined efforts of the security services of the United States, UK, Germany and France. According to Der Spiegel, the first information came from a 36-year-old German man from Hamburg identified as Ahmad Siddiqui, who was detained by authorities in July, 2010, while attempting to fly from Kabul to Europe. He was a member of the Islamic Movement of Uzbekistan and had trained in Pakistan, where he was sheltered by the Haqqani network. Currently he is in custody of NATO at the Bagram Airfield. The German Muslims linked to the plot were associated with the al-Quds Mosque, the mosque frequented by the September 11 terrorists. German authorities have closed the mosque.

On 4 October 2010 a U.S. drone fired a missile at a building in the Mir Ali area of North Waziristan and killed 11 suspected militants believed to be members of Jihad al Islami. Pakistani intelligence officials confirmed on the next day that five German nationals were among them, as well as three other foreigners whose nationalities were not disclosed. The rest were Pakistanis.

A Pakistani intelligence official confirmed that 8 Germans and 2 British brothers were central players in the plot. They were hiding in North Waziristan and were being tracked by Pakistan, Germany, and the UK. A Briton of Pakistani origin named Abdul Jabbar, originally from Jhelum District, suspected of being involved in this plot was killed in a drone strike according to Pakistani officials. He was allegedly being groomed to be the leader of Al-Qaeda group in the UK charged with attacking targets in Europe. According to Pakistani intelligence dozens of Islamic militants with European citizenship, many of Pakistani origin, were hiding in the tribal areas of Pakistan along the Afghan border and plotting attacks in Europe. British Government Communications Headquarters estimates that about 20 Britons are getting training in North Waziristan.

Siddiqui indicated that Younis al-Mauretani was his al-Qaeda contact. In early September 2011 in Quetta, al-Mauretani was arrested by the Pakistani Inter-Services Intelligence with Frontier Corps Balochistan and assistance from U.S. intelligence.

== Response ==
On a visit to Pakistan soon after the plot was uncovered CIA director Leon Panetta demanded full co-operation by Pakistani authorities in neutralizing the plot.

=== Drone strikes ===
The United States responded with an increase of drone attacks on the Waziristan region of Pakistan. In September 2010, 22 drone strikes were carried out, most in a month since the attacks began. On October 4, 2010, a strike killed up to 8 German nationals suspected to be part of this plot. A U.S. official explained that security agencies have had "to work backwards, with your starting point being individuals you believe are involved in plotting, even when you don't have the full outlines of the plot itself... That's why we have been striking - with precision - people and facilities that are part of these conspiracies."

=== Travel advisories ===
The U.S. government issued an advisory asking that citizens "take every precaution to be aware of their surroundings and to adopt appropriate safety measures to protect themselves when traveling" to or within Europe in response to this plot. The British government raised the level of threat of terrorism from "general" to "high" for Britons in Germany and France. Canada urged its citizens to exercise caution when traveling in Europe. However, the Canadian government has not changed or upgraded its official travel advisories. In an unusual move Japan also issued a travel alert warning its citizens of the risks of a terrorist attack in Europe. Swedish foreign ministry also called on its citizens traveling to rest of Europe to be on alert.

== See also ==
- 2010 Times Square car bombing attempt
