= Old Synagogue (Berlin) =

Former synagogue in Berlin, Germany

- German: Alte Synagoge
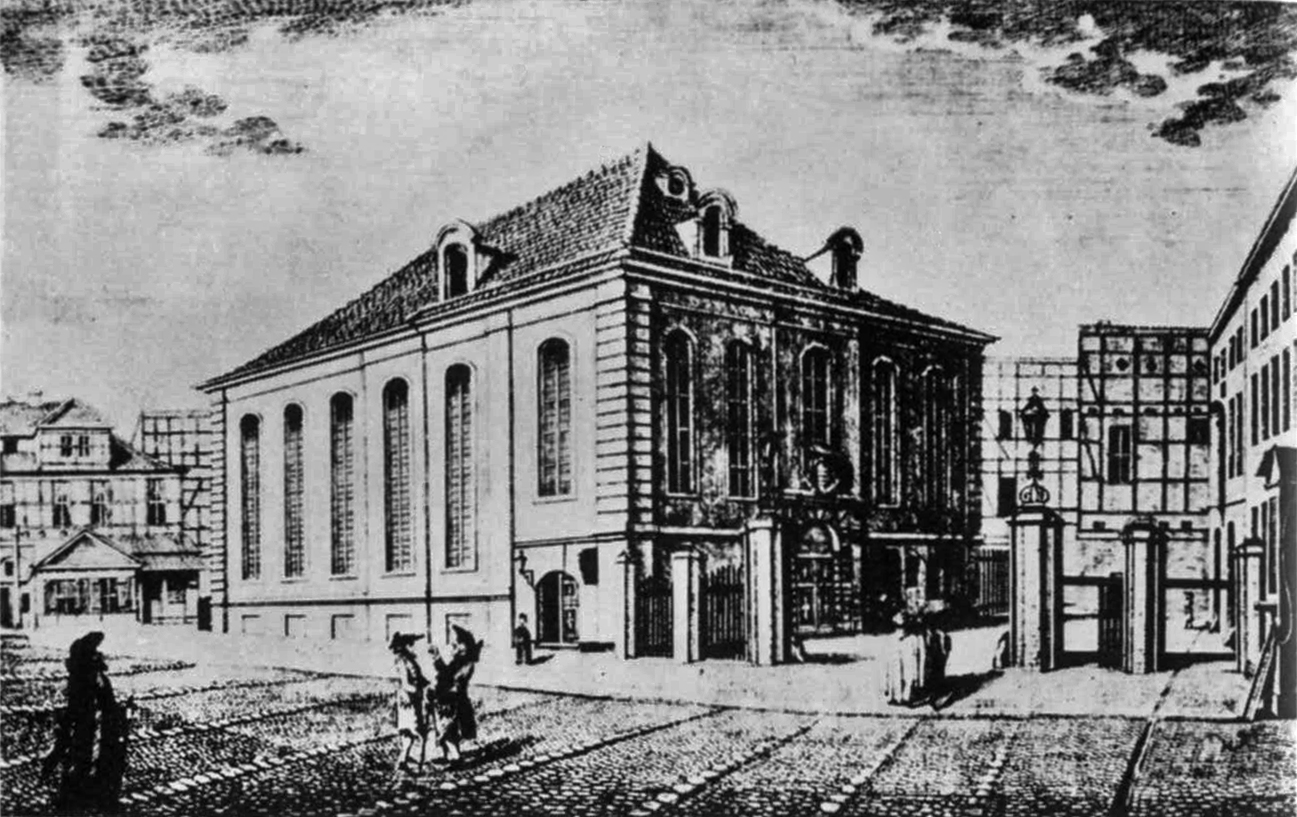
- Engraving of the former synagogue, undated

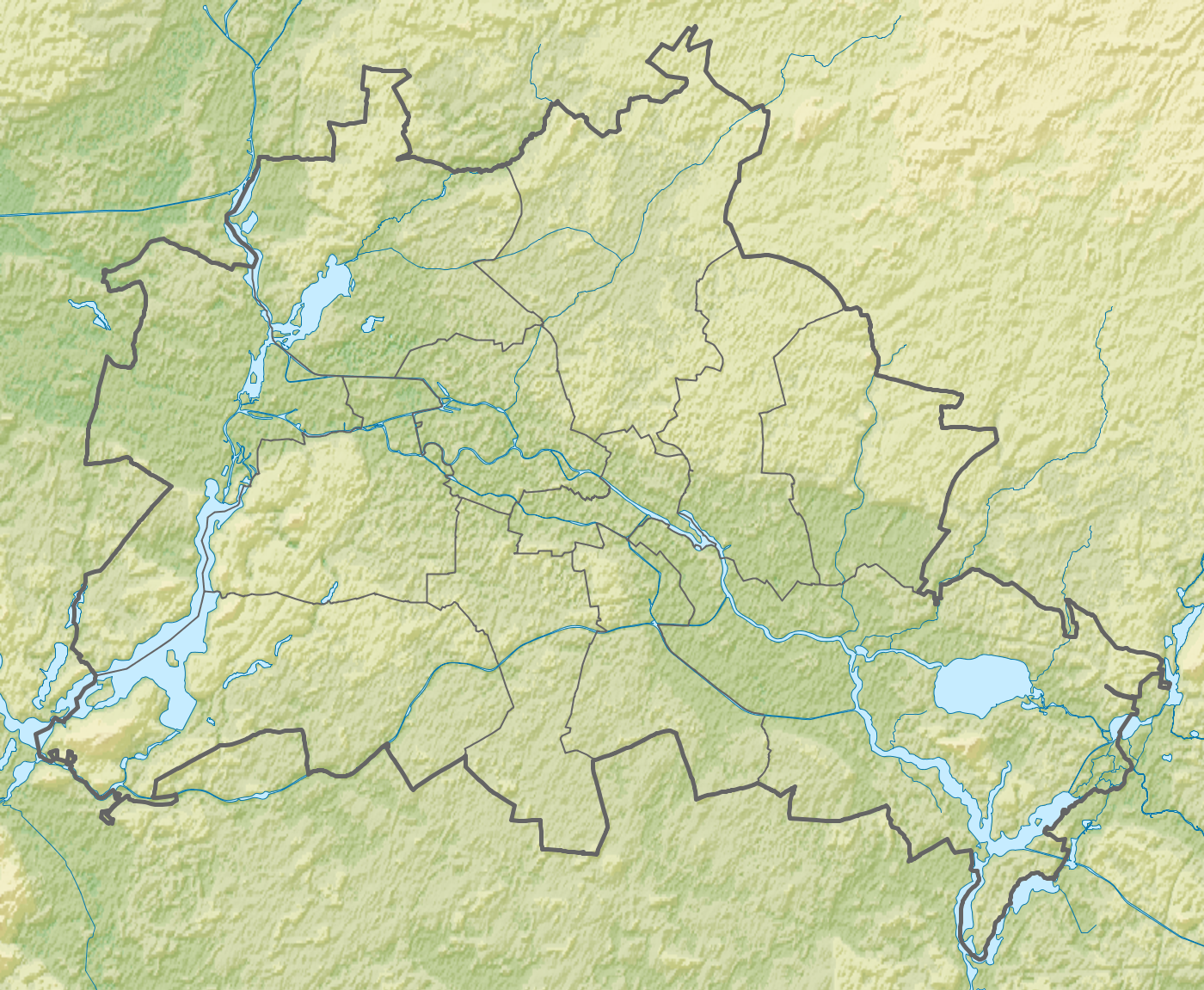
- Location of the former synagogue in Berlin

Religion
- Affiliation: Judaism (former)
- Rite: Nusach Ashkenaz
- Ecclesiastical or organizational status: Synagogue (1714–1942)
- Status: Destroyed (during WWII)

Location
- Location: Heidereutergasse 4, Marienviertel, Berlin
- Country: Germany
- Interactive map of Old Synagogue
- Coordinates: 52°31′16″N 13°24′17″E

Architecture
- Architects: Michael Kemmeter (1714); Eduard Knoblauch (1855)
- Type: Synagogue architecture
- Established: 1642 (as a congregation)
- Groundbreaking: 1712
- Completed: 1714; 1855
- Destroyed: November 1942

The Old Synagogue (German: Alte Synagoge) was a Jewish congregation and synagogue, that was located at Heidereutergasse 4, in Marienviertel, in the present-day Mitte district of Berlin, Germany.

Designed and built by Michael Kemmeter, the synagogue was built as a rectangular hall building. Consecrated in 1714 and remodelled in 1855, the synagogue was known as the Great Synagogue until the opening of the New Synagogue, built in the 1860s to accommodate Berlin's expanding Jewish population. Nevertheless, services continued to be held in the Old Synagogue into the 20th century; it was restored in 1928.

The synagogue survived Kristallnacht but was destroyed during World War II. The last service took place in the Old Synagogue on November 20, 1942. The site is marked with a plaque and part of the building's contours are marked with cobblestones.

== See also ==
- History of the Jews in Germany
- List of synagogues in Germany (in German)
