= Yuna =

Yuna may refer to:

== Places ==
- Yuna, Western Australia
- Yuna River, Dominican Republic

== People ==
=== Athletes ===
- Yuna Manase (born 1987), Japanese professional wrestler
- Yuna Kim (born 1990), South Korean figure skater
- Yuna Nishimura (born 2000), Japanese golfer
- Yuna Shiraiwa (born 2001), Japanese figure skater
- Yuna Aoki (born 2002), Japanese figure skater

=== Artists ===
- Yuna Kagesaki (born 1973), Japanese manga artist

=== Entertainers ===
- Yuju (singer) (born Choi Yu-na, 1997), South Korean singer, member of GFriend and Viviz
- Yuna Ito (born 1983), American-Japanese singer
- Jeon Yu-na (born 2011), South Korean actress
- Kim Yuna (singer) (born 1974), South Korean singer and songwriter
- Lim Yoona (born 1990), South Korean singer and actress, member of Girls' Generation
- Maeng Yu-na (1989–2018), South Korean singer
- Oh Yoon-ah (born 1980), South Korean actress and former racing model
- Park You-na (born 1997), South Korean actress
- Yuna (singer, born 1992), South Korean singer and actress, member of AOA
- Yuna (singer, born 2003), South Korean singer, member of Itzy
- Song Yoon-ah (born 1973), South Korean actress
- Yuna (Malaysian singer) (born 1986), Malaysian singer

=== Fictional characters ===
- Yuna (Final Fantasy), Final Fantasy character
- Yuna Kamihara, Lilo & Stitch anime spin-off character
- Yuna, a supporting character from the light novel and anime series Sword Art Online
- Yuna Hollander, mother of Shane Hollander in the Game Changers novel series

== Other uses ==
- Yuna (album), Third album by Malaysian singer Yuna
- ST Yuna, an Australian tugboat

== See also ==
- Una (disambiguation)
- Yuuna, a Japanese feminine given name
- Yonah (disambiguation)
- Yunan (disambiguation)
- Yunna (disambiguation)
