= Yuuna =

- Pronunciation: [jɯːna]
- Gender: Female

Origin
- Origin: Japanese
- Meaning: Different meanings depending on the kanji used
- Region of origin: Japan

Other names
- Related names: Yuna

Yuuna (ゆうな) is a feminine Japanese given name. It can have many different meanings depending on the kanji used.

== People with given name ==
- Yuuna Inamura (稲村 優奈; born 1982), Japanese voice actress
- Yuuna Kagesaki (影崎 由那; born 1973), Japanese manga artist
- Yuuna Sugiyama (杉山 優奈; born 2002), Japanese child actress
- Yuuna Suzuki (鈴木 友菜; born 1992), Japanese model and actress
- Yuuna Mimura, Japanese voice actress who voiced in the Hanebado! anime
- Yuuna Suzuki, Japanese idol and professional wrestler who went by the ring name Yuna Manase

=== Fictional characters ===
- Yuuna Akashi, a character from the Negima manga
- Yuuna Roma Seiran, a character from the Mobile Suit Gundam Seed anime
- Yuuna Okuyama, a character from the Hori-san to Miyamura-kun manga
- Yuuna Sakashita, a character from the Shirobako anime
- Yuuna Yunohana, the title character from Yuuna and the Haunted Hot Springs manga
- Yuuna Yuuki, a character from the Yuki Yuna Is a Hero

== Other uses ==
- Yuuna and the Haunted Hot Springs, manga and anime series

== See also ==
- Yoona, Im Yoon-ah, South Korean singer and actress
- Younha, Go Yun-ha, South Korean singer
- Yuna (disambiguation)
- Yunna (disambiguation)
- Yunnan, Chinese province
