= Dhaya Pillay =

South African judge

The Honourable Dhaya Pillay

Judge of the KwaZulu-Natal High Court
- Incumbent
- Assumed office 2010
- Nominated by: Judicial Service Commission
- Appointed by: President Jacob Zuma

Judge of the Labour Court of South Africa
- Incumbent
- Assumed office 2000
- Nominated by: Judicial Service Commission
- Appointed by: President Thabo Mbeki

Personal details
- Born: 5 January 1958 (age 68) Durban, South Africa
- Education: University of South Africa; University of Natal

Dhayanithie Pillay (born 5 January 1958) is a South African judge of the Labour Court and KwaZulu-Natal High Court.

== Early life ==
Pillay was born in Durban in 1958 and completed her B.Proc at UNISA in 1982. Early in her career as an attorney, she joined the firm of noted activist lawyer Yunus Mohamed, a founding member of the UDF and the instructing attorney in the Delmas Treason Trial. Pillay became heavily involved in important political cases and effectively led the firm when Mohamed was in detention.

In the late 1980s, Pillay's practice moved towards labour law, in which she later became an expert, acquiring an LLM in the subject from the University of Natal in 1993. Pillay was a drafter of the Labour Relations Act and later became a senior CCMA commissioner. She also served as an advisor to the drafters of the South African Constitution.

== Judicial career ==
Pillay was made a judge of the Labour Court in 2000 and of the KwaZulu-Natal High Court in 2010. She supported Judge President Chiman Patel – now ousted amid suspicions that he fell out with the KwaZulu-Natal political establishment – in the racial spat over his appointment.

In July 2015 she was interviewed and shortlisted by the Judicial Service Commission for appointment to the Constitutional Court of South Africa. She was nominated by rights groups and former Constitutional Court judge Zak Yacoob and was praised by commentators.

== Other positions and awards ==
Pillay is an extraordinary professor at the University of Pretoria and has been a visiting academic at the University of Seattle, New York University, the University of Oxford and the Open University. She was recognised as a human rights defender by the Durban branch of Amnesty International in 2005.
