= Louis Richter =

German footballer (born 2006)

Personal information
- Date of birth: 25 February 2006 (age 20)
- Place of birth: Dachau, Germany
- Height: 1.86 m (6 ft 1 in)
- Positions: Attacking midfielder; winger

Team information
- Current team: Bayern Munich II

Youth career
- –2014: SC Fürstenfeldbruck
- 2014–2025: Bayern Munich

Senior career*
| Years | Team | Apps | (Gls) |
| 2023– | Bayern Munich II | 5 | (1) |
- * Club domestic league appearances and goals as of 27 February 2026

Louis Richter (born 25 February 2006) is a German professional footballer who plays as an attacking midfielder and winger for Regionalliga Bayern club Bayern Munich II.

== Club career ==
Richter was born in Dachau, Germany, and is a youth product of SC Fürstenfeldbruck, later moving to the youth academy of Bayern Munich in 2014.

He received his first call-up and made his professional debut with Bayern Munich II during the 2023–24 season on 10 November 2023, coming off the bench at the second half of a 1–1 home draw Regionalliga Bayern match against Würzburger Kickers.

Richter scored his first professional goal with Bayern Munich II on 24 February 2026, during a 1–0 home win Regionalliga Bayern match against SpVgg Unterhaching.

In March 2026, he extended his contract with the club until 2027, along with teammate Younes Aitamer.

== Career statistics ==
As of match played 27 February 2026

Appearances and goals by club, season and competition
| Club | Season | League | | | Cup | | Total | |
| Club | Season | Division | Apps | Goals | Apps | Goals | Apps | Goals |
|---|---|---|---|---|---|---|---|---|
| Bayern Munich II | 2023–24 | Regionalliga Bayern | 1 | 0 | — | | 1 | 0 |
| Bayern Munich II | 2025–26 | Regionalliga Bayern | 4 | 1 | — | | 4 | 1 |
| Bayern Munich II | Total | | 5 | 1 | — | | 5 | 1 |
| Career Total | | | 5 | 1 | 0 | 0 | 5 | 1 |
