= Jona =

The name Jona is of biblical origin and is associated with the prophet Jona who was sent to preach in Nineveh. The word yōnāh in Hebrew means dove, so it symbolizes peace and hope. In Spain, the name Jona is used as an abbreviation for the name Jonatan, while in other countries, such as Norway, Jona is used as a female name.

Jona may refer to:

- Jona, Switzerland, a village of the municipality Rapperswil-Jona, Switzerland
  - Jona railway station in Rapperswil-Jona
- Jona (river), in the cantons of Zürich and St. Gallen in Switzerland
- Jona (album), an album by Jona Viray

== People with the given name ==
- Jona (actress), Bangladeshi film actress
- Jona (footballer), Honduran footballer
- Jona Bechtolt (born 1980), American electronic musician
- Jona Lendering (born 1964), Dutch historian
- Jona Lewie (born 1947), English singer
- Jona Oberski (born 1938), Dutch writer and nuclear physicist
- Jona Senilagakali (1929–2011), Prime Minister of Fiji
- Jona Soquite (born 2003), Filipina singer
- Jona von Ustinov (1892–1962), German journalist
- Jona Weinhofen (born 1983), Australian guitarist
- Jona Viray (born 1989), Filipino singer

== People with the surname ==
- Giovanni Jona-Lasinio (born 1932), Italian physicist
- Walter Jona (1926–2007), Australian politician

== See also ==
- Iona (disambiguation)
- Jonah (disambiguation)
- Jonen, a municipality in the canton of Aargau, Switzerland
- Yona (disambiguation)
