= Wael Mikhael incident =

Wael Mikhael Incident
- Location: Cairo
- Deaths: 25
- Victims: Wael Mikhael, Mina Daniel, Coptic protesters
- Perpetrator: Egyptian military

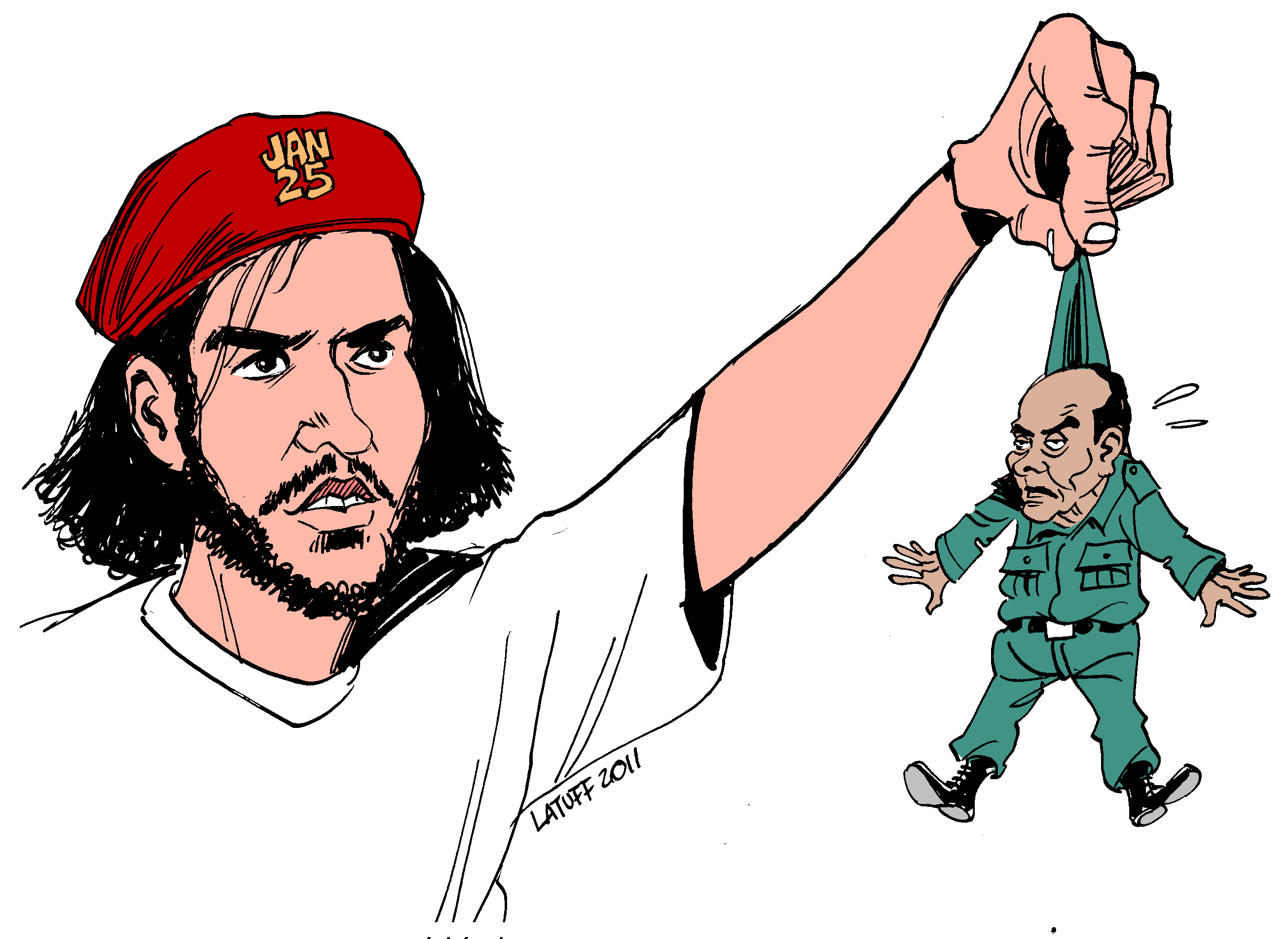
"Tribute to Mina Daniel", by Carlos Latuff, 2011

The Wael Mikhael incident occurred on 9 October 2011 when two Egyptian journalists, Wael Mikhael and Mina Daniel, were killed while covering a demonstration that turned into a violent clash between the Egyptian military and Coptic protesters. Mikhael was reporting as a cameraman for the Coptic Orthodox Christian TV station in Cairo and was shot in the head while filming what was supposed to be a peaceful demonstration. Daniel was reporting as a political activist blogger and was shot in the shoulder and leg.

== Background ==
Egypt's Coptic Christians, who make up more than ten percent of Egypt's 85 million people, say they are repeatedly attacked and have long complained of discrimination in both jobs and politics. In Egypt, Christians have felt vulnerable for many years, even before Hosni Mubarak was deposed in 2011. Of far more concern, however, was the sense that the army was involved in the bloodshed.

== Incident ==
On 9 October 2011, thousands of mainly Coptic Christians joined a march from the Shubra district of northern Cairo to the state TV building in Maspero Square where they intended to hold a peaceful sit-in. The sit-in was organized to protest the state's TV position of fanning the flames of anti-Christian agitation. The demonstrators were first assaulted by attackers in plain clothes then military armored cars ran over people. Thousands joined in the street violence, hurling stones and firing live ammunition into the crowd. What started as a peaceful protest march ended up with 25 dead, 21 of them Coptic Christians, some run over by armored vehicles driven by soldiers supposedly policing the event, others clashing with Muslim extremists.

Daniel's sister said, "Mina was a very kind, righteous person, and he dreamed of Egypt becoming like Europe, where the young people don't have to travel abroad to live their dreams,". Doctors and Interior Ministry officials said bullet wounds accounted for most of the deaths, including that of Mina Daniel, who was shot in the shoulder and leg. More than 300 others were wounded in four hours of street fighting, the Health Ministry said.

"Witnesses, victims and doctors said Monday that demonstrators were killed when military-led security forces drove armored vehicles over as many as six people and fired live ammunition into the crowds. Doctors at a Coptic hospital showed journalists 17 bodies, including one with a crushed skull and others with mangled limbs".

== Reactions ==
Two media rights groups called on Egyptian authorities to investigate the deaths. The International Press Institute (IPI) was concerned about the reports of attacks on a private television station while filming deadly clashes between protestors against perceived religious discrimination, and the military, who were also supported by a group of protestors.
