= Younes Abdulsalam =

Yemeni journalist

Younes Abdulsalam Ahmed (born 1996) is an independent Yemeni journalist who has been detained since 4 August 2021.

== Biography ==
Younes born in 1996 in Taiz Governorate. He graduated from the College of Media, Sana'a University, in 2016. In 2021 he was disappeared for two weeks before his lawyer and defense team revealed that Younes has been detained by the Houthi-controlled Security and Intelligence Service in Sana'a since 4 August 2021, and that his condition has been deteriorated. Amnesty International said the Houthis have arbitrarily detained Younes without any charges and called to release him unconditionally. His lawyer said the Houthis refused to release him despite his bad condition. In August 2020 Younes was detained by troops loyal to Southern Transitional Council in Abyan governorate for a week.
