= Qamar David =

Qamar David (Punjabi: قمر ڈیوڈ (Shahmukhi)) was a Pakistani Christian convicted of blasphemy who died on 15 March 2011, in a jail in Karachi, Pakistan.

== Background ==
Originally from Hamza, in the Pakistani province of Punjab, David was a supplier of cosmetics to shops in Karachi. He was arrested in 2006 for allegedly insulting Muhammad in a text message to a business rival. His lawyers stated that the charges were pushed by rival businessmen. He was convicted in February 2010 by a court in Karachi and sentenced to life in prison. While in prison David had written twice to the Human Rights Commission of Pakistan, a rights NGO, expressing fear for his life and for his family's safety. He also accused the police of torturing him.

== Death ==
David, 57, died on 15 March 2011 after complaining of chest pain. Prison officials stated that he died a natural death and foul play was ruled out. However, David's lawyer Aslam Chaudhry stated that his client was healthy and expressed concerns that David was murdered. Andrew Johnston of Christian Solidarity Worldwide called for an independent investigation of the death. An autopsy was performed on 16 March 2011 by doctors whose initial assessment was that he died of a heart attack. However, histopathology reports were expected to take several days.

== See also ==
- Blasphemy law in Pakistan
- Shahbaz Bhatti
- Asia Bibi
