= Junaid Hafeez =

Pakistani student, teacher, and activist

- جنید حفیظ
- Born: Multan, Punjab, Pakistan
- Education: King Edward Medical College; Bahauddin Zakariya University; Jackson State University
- Employer: Bahauddin Zakariya University
- Criminal charges: Blasphemy
- Criminal penalty: Death
- Criminal status: Incarcerated

Junaid Hafeez (Urdu: جنید حفیظ) is a former M. Phil English student at a Pakistani university where he was teaching as visiting teacher as well. He was convicted of blasphemy under Pakistan's broad blasphemy laws and sentenced to death. Arrested in 2013, Hafeez was accused of making derogatory comments about the prophet of Islam, Muhammad on social media. Held in solitary confinement since 2014, his trial was repeatedly delayed, and Hafeez's first lawyer, Rashid Rehman, was murdered. In December 2019, Hafeez was convicted and sentenced to death by a Pakistani court. His detention and arrest have been condemned by human rights groups.

== Background and arrest ==
Hafeez was born in Rajanpur, Punjab and attended King Edward Medical College in Lahore, Punjab, after being given a gold medal in pre-medical studies at the Board of Intermediate and Secondary Education in the Dera Ghazi Khan Division. In 2006 he left his medical studies to focus on English literature at Bahauddin Zakariya University (BZU) in Multan, Punjab. In 2009, as a Fulbright Scholar, he traveled to Jackson, Mississippi to continue his studies at Jackson State University, where he earned a master's degree in American literature, photography and theater. He returned to BZU Multan in 2011 as a graduate student and a visiting lecturer for the English Department while also teaching at the College of Design. Hafeez taught English literature, and as his thesis, Hafeez was writing an "ethnographic study of masculinity in popular cinema in Multan."

Soon after his arrival, Hafeez was targeted by the Islamist groups Islami Jamiat Talaba (the student group affiliate of the Islamist political party Jamaat-e-Islami) and Tehrik-Tahafaz-e-Namoos-e-Risalat, who opposed Hafeez's more liberal teachings. They distributed pamphlets calling for Hafeez to be arrested and hanged, and staged a strike. Hafeez was quickly expelled and his housing and teaching contracts were revoked.

== Imprisonment and death sentence ==
Hafeez was arrested on 13 March 2013, in Multan. He was held at Sahiwal Jail on the charge of violating section 295-C of the Pakistan Penal Code, the blasphemy law that provides for a death sentence for anyone who in any way "defiles" the name of Muhammad. Blasphemy laws in Pakistan are frequently used to target individuals to settle personal vendettas and to target religious minorities (such as Christians, Hindus, Ahmadis, and atheists) and scholars. Hafeez's father, Hafeez-ul Naseer, has attributed his arrest to the Islamists' opposition to his son's liberal views, and their desire to get one of their own members an open lecturer position. Hafeez has been held in solitary confinement since June 2014, after being repeatedly attacked by other prisoners. Since 2018 his conditions have been reported to have become more extreme, and Hafeez's physical and mental health have declined.

Hafeez was accused of making derogatory comments about Muhammad on Facebook, and of hosting the British-Pakistani novelist Qaisra Shahraz. He was accused of using the account Mulla Munnafiq to comment about Muhammad's wives in the closed group "So-Called Liberals of Pakistan." The police claimed to have gathered 1200 pages of material that incriminates him from his computer as well as a book called "Progressive Muslims" that he had received.

Hafeez struggled to find a lawyer to defend him as the public in Pakistan views negatively anyone who defends someone accused of blasphemy. His original lawyer Mudassar left the case in June 2013 after facing multiple death threats. Attorney Rashid Rehman then took on the case and faced a multitude of death threats himself, commenting to BBC that it was like "walking into the jaws of death" to defend someone accused of blasphemy in Pakistan. A hearing for Hafeez was held on 3 April 2014 at Multan Central Jail and Rehman was told that he would not live to attend the next hearing by the prosecuting attorneys. Despite these threats being made in front of the presiding judge, no charges were brought against them. On 7 May, two men walked into Rehman's office in Multan, shot him to death, and fled.

Hafeez is represented by Shahbaz Gurmani as of December 2014; Gurmani, who is also representing two other defendants in blasphemy cases, has also received death threats including an incident where guns were fired outside of his home.

Hafeez's case was repeatedly delayed, proceeding before eight different judges, the previous seven having been transferred. In November 2019, Hafeez's parents wrote to Chief Justice Asif Saeed Khosa, writing: "our son continues to await justice in a fabricated case." Human rights organizations Amnesty International and Human Rights Watch have called for Hafeez's immediate and unconditional release and the repeal of Pakistan's blasphemy laws. Amnesty International has designated Hafeez a prisoner of conscience, "detained solely for peacefully exercising his right to freedom of expression." Calls for Hafeez's release have also been made by the U.S. government and the organization Scholars at Risk. Pakistan author Ali Sethi, in an op-ed published in the New York Times, described Hafeez's case as an example of "Pakistan's Tyranny of Blasphemy" characterized by extremist-led, government-tolerated violence and the murders of political dissidents.

In December 2019, Hafeez was sentenced to death by a court at Multan Central Jail, the high-security prison where Hafeez was held. The verdict prompted an outcry from Hafeez's family and human rights groups. Amnesty International called it a "a vile and gross miscarriage of justice" and human rights activist I. A. Rehman, the former general secretary of the Human Rights Commission of Pakistan, said: "The verdict is brutal and unjust. He has been in prison for six years for no reason. It is an open fact that trial courts in Pakistan rarely acquit accused in blasphemy cases." Jail officials reportedly feared a mob attack if Hafeez was acquitted, and Hafeez's family said that the court had convicted due to external threats. Hafeez's lawyer Asad Jamal said that Hafeez would appeal the verdict.

== See also ==
- Human rights in Pakistan
- Mariam Yahia Ibrahim Ishag
- Qamar David
- Rimsha Masih blasphemy case
