= Younis al-Mauritani =

Member of al-Qaeda

- Born: 1981 (age 44–45); Saudi Arabia

Younis al-Mauritani, born Abd al-Rahman Ould Muhammad al-Husayn Ould Muhammad Salim in 1981, is an al-Qaeda chief arrested on charges of planning and executing international operations for the global terror network including involvement in the 2010 European terror plot. The White House praised the capture - reportedly the result of co-operation between US and Pakistani intelligence services. Younis was arrested along with two associates. This capture came a month after the United States reported they would be withholding millions of financial assistance from the Pakistani government.

Al-Mauritani was captured by the Pakistani Inter-Services Intelligence with Frontier Corps Balochistan and assistance from U.S. intelligence on September 6, 2011 in his Quetta, Pakistan safehouse.

Al-Mauritani was extradited to Mauritania on May 31, 2013. He was sentenced to 20 years in prison on April 20, 2015.
