= Younes Bensouda Mourri =

Moroccan computer scientist and educator

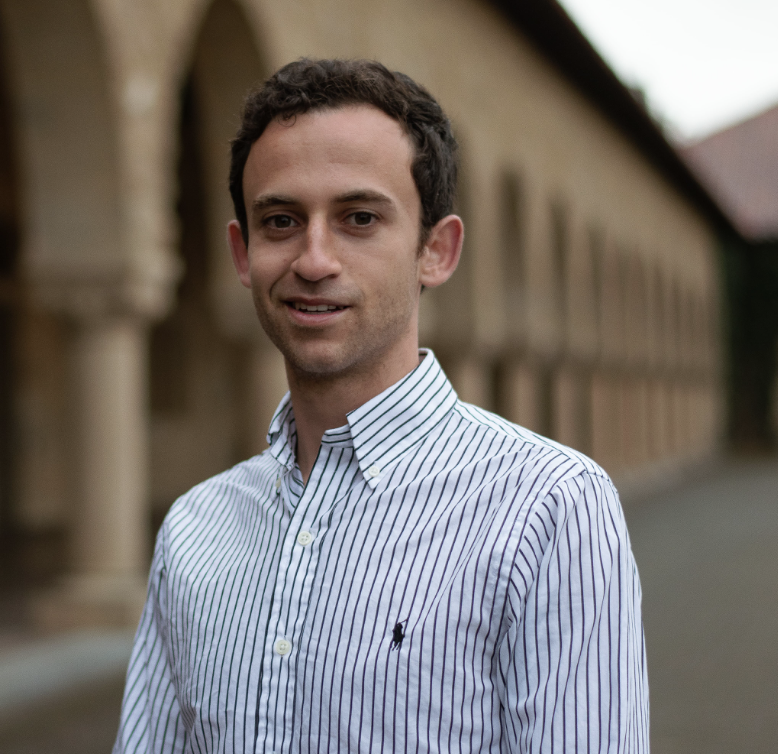
- Younes Bensouda Mourri, CEO of LiveTech.AI and educator at Stanford University
- Born: October 28, 1995 (age 31); Rabat, Morocco
- Education: The American School of Tangier, Stanford University (BS, MS)
- Occupations: Artificial Intelligence, Computer Scientist, Speaker, Educator, and Entrepreneur
- Known for: Artificial intelligence, MOOCs
- Website: https://younesmourri.com/

Younes Bensouda Mourri, is a Moroccan computer scientist, educator, and entrepreneur. He is known for founding LiveTech.AI, a generative AI platform that works with education ministries and academic institutions. Additionally, Mourri teaches computer science at Stanford University and has been involved in the development of online courses related to artificial intelligence.

== Education and early life ==
Younes Bensouda Mourri was born in 1995 in Rabat, Morocco, and raised in Tangier. He graduated from the American School of Tangier in 2014. Subsequently, he enrolled at Stanford University, where he obtained a Bachelor of Science in Mathematics and Computer Science in 2018, followed by a Master of Science in Statistics in 2020. His academic research focused on probabilistic modeling, machine learning algorithms, and artificial intelligence education.

== Career ==
Mourri began teaching at Stanford University in 2018, shortly after completing his undergraduate studies. He is listed as an instructor in the Computer Science Department, where he has taught courses such as CS129 (Applied Machine Learning), CS230 (Deep Learning), and CS93 (Teaching AI). In 2020, Mourri joined Stanford's Computer Science Department as a lecturer, where he co-designed and taught foundational courses in artificial intelligence. He also contributed to the Deep Learning Specialization on Coursera, developed in partnership with DeepLearning.AI and Andrew Ng, which has been completed by over one million learners.

In 2021, Mourri founded LiveTech.AI, an educational platform that utilizes artificial intelligence to offer data dashboards, adaptive learning tools, and analytics for students, teachers, and education ministries. The platform has been implemented in several countries.

From 2017 to 2021, Mourri contributed to the development of the curriculum for the Deep Learning Specialization at DeepLearning.AI, a series of online courses led by Andrew Ng. Independent reports indicate that the courses have been completed by over one million learners worldwide. Additionally, he contributed to the Natural Language Processing Specialization on Coursera alongside Lukasz Kaiser.

Mourri is involved in projects that apply artificial intelligence to support education systems, including collaborations with ministries of education in the Middle East and North Africa (MENA) region. In early 2025, he began working with partners in Washington state to implement AI systems for schools. He has discussed the potential of generative AI to assist teachers and enhance students' learning in various interviews and podcasts.

== Media and speaking engagements ==
Mourri has delivered talks and workshops at international conferences and summits, often focusing on the intersection of artificial intelligence and education.

- TEDx Talk- "Le futur de l'éducation avec l'IA" in Morocco (2023).

- Brain Regional Bootcamp in South Africa (2025).

- Digital Bridge 2025 – "AI and the Future of Learning" panel, Astana, Kazakhstan (2025).

- WISE On Air – "LiveTech.AI CEO Younes Bensouda Mourri on 'AI's Role in Transforming Global Education'"

- Rail News Kazakhstan – "AI Seminar at Kazakhstan Temir Zholy with Younes Bensouda Mourri"

- Caracol Radio – "The Future of Education in Colombia"
