= Central Jail Peshawar =

Prison in Peshawar, Pakistan

Central Prison Peshawar is a jail located in Peshawar in Khyber Pakhtunkhwa, Pakistan. The jail is located next to important buildings such as the Peshawar High Court and the Provincial Assembly of Khyber Pakhtunkhwa.

== History ==
The Central Prison Peshawar was established in 1884 with a capacity of 450 prisoners.

== Anti-terrorism measures ==
After 2014 Peshawar school massacre further security measures were taken to fend off terrorism attacks. A steel wall was built around the premises of prison and elite forces were called to strengthen the security. Important prisoners including Dr. Shakil Afridi, accused of assisting the Central Intelligence Agency to track down Osama bin Laden through a fake vaccination campaign, and Tehreek-e-Nafaz-e-Shariat-e-Mohammadi Chief Maulana Sufi Muhammad, father-in-law of outlawed Tehreek-i-Taliban Pakistan head Maulana Fazlullah, are imprisoned at the Central Prison Peshawar.

== Kebab shop incident ==
A fully functional and operating kebab shop was exposed by Geo News. A letter to Interior Security Khyber Pakhtunkhwa by the Peshawar police to investigate how a kebab shop was running in the most sensitive part of the jail.
