= Yunus (disambiguation) =

Jonah in Islam is a prophet and messenger of God.

Yunus may also refer to:

- Yunus, the Biblical prophet Jonah
- Yunus (given name), list of people with this given name
- Yunus (surname), list of people with this surname
- Yunus (sura), a Quranic sura
- Yunus, Iran, a village in Hamadan Province

== See also ==
- Yunusabad (or Yunus Abad), a Tashkent district
- Ibn Yunus (crater), a lunar crater
- Tan Sri Hassan Yunus Stadium, a multi-use Malaysian stadium
- Habar Yoonis, a Somali clan
- Khan Yunis, refugee camp in the Gaza Strip
