= Younes Aitamer =

Algerian footballer (born 2003)

Younes Aitamer يونس أيت عامر
Personal information
- Full name: Younes Aitamer
- Date of birth: 23 April 2003 (age 23)
- Place of birth: Munich, Germany
- Height: 1.75 m (5 ft 9 in)
- Position: Winger

Team information
- Current team: Bayern Munich II

Youth career
- 2013–2017: SpVgg Unterhaching
- 2017–2022: Bayern Munich

Senior career*
Years	Team	Apps	(Gls)
2021–	Bayern Munich II	52	(10)

International career
2021–2022	Algeria U20	6	(0)
- * Club domestic league appearances and goals as of 22 March 2024

Younes Aitamer (Arabic: يونس أيت عامر; born 23 April 2003) is a professional footballer who plays as a winger for Regionalliga Bayern club Bayern Munich II. Born in Germany, he is a former Algeria youth international.

== Early life ==
Born in Munich, Germany, Aitamer moved from the youth academy of German side SpVgg Unterhaching and joined the youth academy of German Bundesliga side Bayern Munich at the age of fourteen. He was part of the club's under-19 team by the age of seventeen.

== Club career ==
Aitamer started his professional career with German side Bayern Munich II. On 28 September 2021, he debuted for the club during a 6–3 away win Regionalliga Bayern match against 1. FC Schweinfurt 05. On 3 August 2022, he scored his first professional goal, with the club during a 3–2 away win Regionalliga Bayern match against DJK Vilzing.

In September 2024, Aitamer extended his contract with Bayern Munich until 2026. In March 2026, he extended his contract with the club until 2027, along with teammate Louis Richter.

== International career ==
Born in Germany, he represented the Algeria U20s internationally at youth level from 2021 to 2022.

== Career statistics ==
=== Club ===
As of match played 22 March 2024

Appearances and goals by club, season and competition
Club	Season	League			National cup		Other		Total	
Club	Season	Division	Apps	Goals	Apps	Goals	Apps	Goals	Apps	Goals
Bayern Munich II	2021–22	Regionalliga Bayern	3	0	—		—		3	0
Bayern Munich II	2022–23	Regionalliga Bayern	29	6	—		—		29	6
Bayern Munich II	2023–24	Regionalliga Bayern	20	4	—		—		20	4
Bayern Munich II	Total		52	10	—		—		52	10
Career total			52	10	0	0	0	0	52	10

== Style of play ==
Aitamer mainly operates as a winger. He is known for his versatility and can also operate as a wide midfielder, wing-back and full-back.

== Personal life ==
Aitamer holds dual German and Algerian citizenship, he has regarded Algeria international Riyad Mahrez as his football idol.
