= Yunus Şencay =

Turkish footballer (born 1997)

Personal information
- Full name: Yunus Şencay
- Date of birth: 4 February 1997 (age 29)
- Place of birth: Şehitkamil, Turkey
- Position: Central midfielder

Team information
- Current team: 1074 Çankırıspor
- Number: 14

Youth career
- 2010–2017: Gaziantepspor

Senior career*
Years	Team	Apps	(Gls)
2017–2018	Gaziantepspor	8	(0)
2018–2019	Karaköprü Belediyespor	2	(0)
2019–2020	Yozgatspor	12	(0)
2021–	1074 Çankırıspor	9	(1)
- * Club domestic league appearances and goals as of 06:43, 27 January 2022 (UTC)

Yunus Şencay (born 4 February 1997) is a Turkish footballer who plays as midfielder for 1074 Çankırıspor.

== Professional career ==
A youth product of Gaziantepspor, Şencay made his professional debut for the club a 4–1 loss to Antalyaspor on 2 June 2017. He stayed with the club until 2018, where he and several other players were indefinitely excluded from the squad. He followed that up with stints with Karaköprü Belediyespor, Yozgatspor, before moving to 1074 Çankırıspor in 2021.
