= Glenn Younes =

American radio personality

Glenn Younes is a former sports radio personality, philanthropist and founder of Corner Unit Media. On August 22, 2011 he started on Baltimore's 105.7 The Fan WJZ-FM which is licensed to Catonsville, MD. He will also be part of pre- and post-game show broadcasts of the NFL's Baltimore Ravens on 105.7 The Fan.

He has been a host & anchor for Sirius XM radio. Glenn hosted the Mad Dog Sports weekend show Saturday and Sunday nights on Mad Dog Radio and through 2010 was the primary fill in host for the channel, regularly filling in for the channel's namesake Christopher "Mad Dog" Russo. He was also heard giving updates weekday mornings on MLB Home Plate and Mad Dog Radio.

Glenn has previously hosted the College Football Scoreboard Show with Bill Rohland as well as hosted shows and done updates on the Sirius XM PGA Tour Network. Prior to joining Sirius XM Glenn's radio experience included Fox Sports Radio and SportsTalk 980 in Washington, DC.

In addition to his radio work Glenn is the Director of Ed Reed Foundation (formerly Eye of the Hurricane Foundation) which is a non-profit charity organization founded by Ed Reed of the Baltimore Ravens.
