= Shirin Asal Food Industrial Group =

Iranian food company

- Native name: گروه صنایع غذایی شیرین‌عسل
- Type: Private company
- Industry: Food processing
- Founded: 1990; 36 years ago
- Headquarters: Tabriz, East Azerbaijan, Iran
- Area served: Worldwide
- Key people: Younes Jaele (Founder & CEO)
- Products: Confectionery, dairy products, biscuits, snack foods
- Owner: Younes Jaele
- Number of employees: 20,000 (est.)
- Website: www.shirinasal.com

Shirin Asal Food Industrial Group (گروه صنایع غذایی شیرین‌عسل) is an Iranian food manufacturing company headquartered in Tabriz. Founded in 1990 by Younes Jaele, it has grown into one of the largest confectionery and food processing groups in the Middle East. The company operates a vertically integrated supply chain, managing production from raw cocoa bean processing to finished shelf products.

== History ==
The company was established in 1990 in Tabriz, East Azerbaijan province. It began operations as a small workshop primarily producing biscuit sandwiches wrapped in chocolate. Over the subsequent decades, the company significantly expanded its infrastructure and product lines to include cocoa processing, dairy production, and animal husbandry. The group is notable for being the only fully integrated confectionery manufacturer in Iran, processing cocoa beans directly rather than relying on imported cocoa liquor or powder.

== Operations and products ==
Shirin Asal manufactures approximately 1,000 distinct stock keeping units (SKUs) across a wide variety of categories to serve different market segments. The group's diverse product portfolio encompasses confectionery items such as chocolates, marshmallows, toffees, jelly products, and hard candies, alongside baked goods including biscuits, cakes, wafers, cookies, and crackers. In addition to sweets, the company produces dairy items like milk, cheese, butter, and cream, as well as industrial raw materials such as cocoa powder, cocoa butter, and cocoa mass. The group also maintains agro-industrial operations that produce oil seeds, conserved foods, and animal husbandry products. These goods are marketed under several brand names, including Shirin Asal, Albina, Ace, and Salmin.

== Acquisitions ==
In 2018, Shirin Asal Group acquired the Moghan Agro-Industrial & Livestock Company, a major state-owned enterprise located in Ardabil province, through a privatization auction. The deal included vast tracts of farmland, orchards, and livestock facilities utilized for agriculture and animal husbandry. However, the privatization process faced scrutiny from Iranian authorities and local protests regarding the valuation and transparency of the sale, which subsequently led to legal interventions and the annulment of the transfer.

== Exports ==
Shirin Asal is a significant exporter within the Iranian food sector, shipping products to over 60 countries across the Middle East, the Commonwealth of Independent States (CIS), Africa, and Eastern Europe. The company is headquartered in East Azerbaijan province, which is considered a hub for Iran's confectionery industry. Reports from the Trade Promotion Organization of Iran indicate that the province, home to major manufacturers including Shirin Asal, Aydin, and Shoniz, accounts for a substantial portion—estimated between 40% and 60%—of Iran's total pastry and chocolate exports.
