= Charsadda arson attack =

Burning of police station in Pakistan

- Location: Charsadda District, Khyber Pakhtunkhwa, Pakistan
- Date: 28 November 2021
- Target: police officers
- Attack type: arson attack
- Deaths: 0
- Injuries: 0

On 28 November 2021, religiously motivated arsonists destroyed a police station in Charsadda District, Khyber Pakhtunkhwa, Pakistan.

== Background ==
In Pakistan, blasphemy is a very serious crime which carries the death penalty. The Pakistani government have sentenced some prisoners convicted of blasphemy to death, but has not executed anyone. Some blasphemy suspects have been lynched. Domestic and international human rights groups have said that these laws can be abused and used to persecute religious minorities and to take revenge for personal reasons.

== Arrest of blasphemy suspect ==
On 28 November 2021, police arrested an apparently seriously mentally-ill man for allegedly desecrating a Quran by tearing out some of its pages. He was taken to the Mandani police station in Tangi Tehsil, Charsadda District, Khyber Pakhtunkhwa, northwest Pakistan.

== Attack ==
Later on the day of the arrest, a group of protesters, whom the police described as a mob of four to five thousand people, gathered outside the police station. They demanded the police hand the suspect to them. The police refused to do so, and during the night the protesters attacked the station, stealing weapons and burning the building down. They also set fire to the vehicles in its car park. The police fled, taking the suspect to an undisclosed location. Following the attack, the mob set fire to a police check post on Harichand Road. They blocked the road and staged a sit-in there. The police dispersed them; eyewitnesses said the police used tear gas and aerial firing to do so.

== Reaction ==
Later, local leaders of Deobandi Sunni political party Jamiat Ulema-e-Islam (F) demonstrated in Mandani bazaar, demanded that the suspect be punished.
