= Yona Verwer =

Dutch-born visual artist

- Known for: Contemporary painting

Yona Verwer is a Dutch-born visual artist, living in New York City.

Her works have explored various themes, such as identity, cultural heritage, terrorism, tikkun olam, as well as the spiritual concepts of kabbalah. Verwer holds a master's degree in Fine Art from the Royal Academy of Art, The Hague.

Her work has explored architecture and communities. Using the resources of inventive new technology, and based on research of archival photos, documents and artifacts, she connects Jewish architecture with its old world origins. Weaving together the stories of the past and the present, synagogues from throughout the world come alive. Her focus is on places particularly pregnant with history. These interactive works allow the viewer to actively connect with Jewish heritage.

== Art ==
Verwer is one of three contemporary artists featured in the exhibition NOAH: A Future Hope, which explores humanity’s responsibility to care for the earth through the shared story of Noah and the flood. The exhibition brings together perspectives from three major Abrahamic faith traditions and addresses themes of environmental stewardship, moral responsibility, and ecological care. Verwer’s “Protest Art” Tightrope, an installation previously at It’s A Thin Line exhibit at the Yeshiva University Museum, explored the impact that the lack of an eruv has on families with young children and the infirm. Her Kabbala of Bling series comments on the appropriation of Kabbala by pop icons. City Charms amulet photographs invoke protection from acts of destruction on buildings, particularly terror-watch-list targets, a theme she continues in her apotropaic images in the Temple Talismans series.

== Exhibits ==
Verwer's work is in the permanent collection of the Mizel Museum, the Philadelphia Museum of Jewish Art, and private collections. Other exhibits took place at the Yeshiva University Museum It's A Thin Line, the Bronx Museum of the Arts, the Philadelphia Museum of Jewish Art The Dura Europos Project, the Canton Museum of Art, Reginald F. Lewis Museum of Maryland African-American History & Culture Transcending History: Slavery & the Holocaust, and at the Holocaust Memorial Center's Silent Witnesses.

She completed residencies at The New Museum with Art Kibbutz, the PS 122 Studio Program, the Makor Center and the Skirball Center for Adult Jewish Learning in New York.

Her mural work includes 7 Days, a large-scale installation executed during her artist-in-residency program at the S.A.R. High School in Riverdale, NY.

== Curation ==
The Educational Alliance’s inaugural exhibit at the Manny Cantor Center, opening January 2015, is curated by Linda Griggs and Yona Verwer. All Together Different features work by current East Village and Lower East Side artists. In 2014 Verwer curated The Jewish Waltz with Planet Earth, a Jewish environmental land art exhibit for Art Kibbutz at New York’s Governor’s Island, while at The Anne Frank Center she co-curated Faith & Form: Addressing Intolerance & Anti-semitism.

Besides organizing many salon sessions for the Jewish Art Salon, she co-curated Silent Witnesses: Synagogues Transformed, Rebuilt, and Left Behind, in collaboration with Cynthia Beth Rubin and the Cultural Heritage Artists Project. Participating artists and Yale scholars explored the intersection of community, migration and Jewish heritage. Text and Context, a group exhibit in partnership with Oholiav, also featured several innovative interdisciplinary art events.

Other inter-active multimedia art events include Talmud Synesthesia and Celebrate Text: Shenanigans. She was a curatorial adviser for JOMIX: Jewish Comics - Art & Derivation at the UJA-NY in 2015, Generation D: Identity, at the Flomenhaft Gallery, and The Dura Europos Project, at Philadelphia Museum of Jewish Art.

At the Columbia / Barnard Kraft Building Verwer organized Into the Void - Works by Cynthia Beth Rubin, Warrior / Peacemaker, Graphic Novel by Julian Voloj, and Fractured Epics: Historical Paintings and Imaginary Portraits by Joel Silverstein. Terror: American & Israeli Artists Respond featuring artists such as Adi Nes, and Zoya Cherkassky, took place at the Industry City Gallery in Brooklyn. Panel discussions Verwer organized include topics such as A new creative spirit: How contemporary Jewish artists are forming partnerships with American Jewish museums during the CAJM conference at the Philadelphia Museum for Jewish Art, Jewish Diversity in Art at the Manhattan JCC. At the Columbia / Barnard Kraft Center Verwer created the panels Imagery After Abstraction: Filling the Void, with Helene Aylon, Elisa Decker, Bruria Finkel and Debra Zarlin Edelman, Still Small Voice: Jewish Heritage in Contemporary Art, and Jewish Narrative Painting.
