= Rashid Rehman =

Pakistani lawyer (1958–2014)

- Born: 13 October 1958; Karachi, Pakistan
- Died: 7 May 2014 (aged 55); Multan, Pakistan
- Occupation: Lawyer
- Children: 3

Rashid Rehman (13 October 1958 – 7 May 2014) was a Pakistani lawyer and a regional coordinator for the Human Rights Commission of Pakistan (HRCP). He was well known for his work with clients who were poor or who were charged under Pakistan's vigorous blasphemy laws.

After he became the defence lawyer for Junaid Hafeez in a controversial and widely publicized blasphemy case, he received death-threats, lastly in court in April 2014 by prosecution lawyers, but Rehman refused to abandon his client. As a result of this incident, complaints were laid with police and the District Bar Association but no action had been taken or protection provided when he was shot and killed by gunmen on 7 May 2014, and two colleagues injured.

== See also ==
- Shahid Azmi
