= Yunus Mohamed =

South African lawyer and activist (1950–2008)

Yunus "YM" Mohamed (sometimes Mahomed) (12 June 1950 – 6 January 2008) was a South African lawyer and activist instrumental in founding the United Democratic Front (UDF).

Mohamed was born in Johannesburg to Amina and Ismail Mohamed, one of at least five children. Growing up in Jeppe, he was educated at Gold Street Primary School and William Hills Secondary School. He then went to Natal, to the University of Durban-Westville, where in 1972 he took part in SASO's student boycotts. He eventually graduated from the University of South Africa.

He joined the Natal Indian Congress (NIC) in 1970, and later the South African Communist Party (SACP) and ANC.

In 1976 he became an attorney, going on to work for the law firm of Shun Chetty, which had a record of defending anti-apartheid activists. He joined the Democratic Lawyers' Association and his work included the Chatsworth housing action committee and the Natal rates committee. From 1981 to 82 he was detained, and in 1985 was arrested again. In 1986 he served on the economic intelligence desk of the ANC. He was involved in negotiations with the Inkatha Freedom Party to help reduce political violence in KwaZulu-Natal.

He was a founding member of the UDF in 1983, and later became regional secretary for Natal. According to fellow UDF founder Trevor Manuel

Revolutions need the undercarriage of thinkers, planners and persuaders. It was to this grouping that Yunus Mohamed so obviously belonged. My experience of him was of a persuader not because he feared; on the contrary by the time we first met he had already tasted solitary confinement, but because he was so focused on success. Yunus was one of those who gave our struggle form, depth, shape and style!

— Trevor Manuel

When three senior members of the UDF – Frank Chikane, Popo Molefe and Patrick Lekota – and 19 others were arrested for treason, Mohamed was an instructing attorney in what became known as the Delmas Treason Trial. The trial ran from 1985 to 1988, with sentences being overturned by the Supreme Court in 1989.

Post apartheid, he was a founding trustee of the Kagiso Trust, of which he was chairman at his death in 2008.

Mohamed's partner, Dhaya Pillay, is a senior judge in the Labour Court of South Africa.
