= Yonah =

Yonah may refer to:

- Yonah (microprocessor), a code name for a processor in Intel's Pentium M line
- The Yonah (locomotive), a steam locomotive in the Great Locomotive Chase during the American Civil War
- Yonah, Georgia
- Yonah Gerondi (died 1264), Catalan rabbi
- Yonah Martin (born 1965), Korean-Canadian senator
- Yonah Mountain, a mountain in northern Georgia, United States
- Lake Yonah, on the Georgia – South Carolina border in the United States
- the English transliteration for Jonah (יונה) in Hebrew and means dove

== See also ==
- Yona
- Yuna (disambiguation)
