= Younus Shaikh (author) =

Pakistani author

Mohammad Younus Shaikh (or Younis Sheik or Younis Sheikh) (born 1965) is a hotel manager and writer in Kharadar, Pakistan. In 2005, he wrote a book: "Shaitan Maulvi" (Satanic Cleric). On account of that book, the police charged Shaikh with offences under the Pakistan Penal Code and the Anti-terrorism Act. An anti-terrorism court found Shaikh guilty of those offences, and sentenced him to a fine and life imprisonment. Amnesty International designated him a prisoner of conscience and called for his immediate release.

== Personal details ==
Shaikh is a matriculate but he has not had any religious education.

== The offence ==
On 3 February 2005, Shaikh was distributing copies of his book when he came to the attention of Sub-inspector Gulzar Ahmed Khokhar. The Sub-inspector arrested Shaikh for violating Sections 153A, 295A, and 295B of the Pakistan Penal Code, and Sections 8 and 9 of the Anti-terrorism Act. The police placed Shaikh in solitary confinement in Karachi Central Prison to prevent other inmates from attacking him.

At trial, the special public prosecutor proved that Shaikh had committed blasphemy by writing that stoning to death (Rajm) as a punishment for adultery was not mentioned in the Quran, and by insulting four historical Imams (religious leaders) by describing them as "Jews".

On 11 August 2005, Judge Arshad Noor Khan of the Anti-Terrorism Court found Shaikh guilty of "defiling a copy of the Quran, outraging religious feelings and propagating religious hatred among society". The judge imposed upon Shaikh a fine of 100,000 rupees, and sentenced him to spend his life in jail.

In 2007, a blogger reported that Shaikh appealed his conviction to the High Court, and won the right to a new trial.

At least one observer, legal historian Sadakat Kadri, has noted the case as an example of the "mean spirit" of some anti-blaspheme campaigners, as, in fact Shaikh is correct that nowhere in the Quran is stoning to death (rajm) called for to punish the sin of adultery or fornication (zina). (The Quran mentions only lashing as a punishment for zina. It is a hadith (the collections of the reports said to quote what Muhammad said) that call for rajm.)

== See also ==
- Apostasy in Islam
- Blasphemy
- Blasphemy in Pakistan
