= Jonas (name) =

Jonas is a common male name in many countries in the Western world and Northeast Africa. It is primarily used as a first name, but also occurs as a surname. It is particularly frequent in Germany, Israel, Ethiopia, the Netherlands, Flanders and Scandinavia. It is also the most common name in Lithuania; however, in Lithuania, the name Jonas is derived from the Hebrew Yohanan as opposed to Jonah.

Its widespread use and popularity has roots in its Jewish and Christian origins. As a surname, it is often Jewish, whilst as a first name it is mostly used in countries where Christianity is the main religion, especially in Scandinavian countries, Celtic countries, and Germany. In Turkish, Arabic, Persian and the Muslim world the equivalent name is Yunus (یونس) or Yunas or Younes/Younis. In North America the name found popularity among Métis and Aboriginals in the Northwest.

== Etymology ==
Jonas most often represents Hebrew יוֹנָה (Yōnā) meaning 'dove', the name of multiple Biblical figures. The form Jonah is taken directly from Hebrew, while the form with s is adapted through Greek.

Greek Ίωνας (Ionas) may also mean "Ionian", a member of the Greek tribe Ιωνες Iones who colonized western Asia.

== Variants ==
- Giona (Italian)
- Jonàs (Catalan)
- Jona (Croatian)
- Jonáš (Czech)
- Jonah (English)
- Jonas (German, Swedish, Dutch, Lithuanian and Portuguese)
- Jónás (Hungarian)
- Jónas (Icelandic)
- Joona (Finnish)
- Joonas (Finnish)
- Jonaš (Prekmurje Slovene)
- Jonáš (Slovak)
- Jona (Slovene)
- Jonás (Spanish)
- Jonasz (Polish)
- Yona (Hebrew)
- Yonas (ዮናስ) (Amharic) (Ethiopian)
- Yunus (Turkish)
- Yunes (یونس) (Persian)
- Younes (يونس) (Arabic)
- Joonas (Estonian and Finnish)
- Ionas (Ίωνας) (Greek)

== Notable people with the given name ==
- Jonas Aidoo (born 2002), American basketball player
- Jonas Åkerlund, Swedish movie and music video director
- Jonas Erik Altberg (born 1984), Swedish singer, record producer and DJ, Basshunter
- Jonas Armstrong, British/Irish actor
- Jonas Arnell, Herald in the Chancery of the Swedish Royal Orders of Knighthood
- Jonas Backofen (born 2001), Austrian curler
- Jonas Bade (born 1956), Papua New Guinean boxer
- Jonas Baes (born 1961), Filipino composer
- Jonas Bager (born 1996), Danish footballer
- Jonas Bahamboula (born 1949), Congolese footballer
- Jonas Balan (born 1956), Haitian artist
- Jonas Bane (born 1987), Swedish actor
- Jonas Basanavičius (1851–1927), Lithuanian activist
- Jonas Mohammed Bath (died 1838), Community leader in Trinidad
- Jonas Baumann (born 1990), Swiss cross-country skier
- Jonas Bauža (1942–2001), Soviet/Lithuanian footballer
- Jonas Behounek (born 1998), German footballer
- Jonas Bendiksen (born 1977), Norwegian photojournalist
- Jonas Bendorius (1889–1954), Soviet conductor and composer
- Jonas Berggren (born 1967), Swedish musician and producer
- Jonas Berglund (born 1990), Swedish ice hockey player
- Jonas Bergman (1724–1810), Finnish painter
- Jonas Bergquist (born 1966), Swedish chemist, neuroscientist and professor
- Jonas Bergqvist (born 1962), Swedish ice hockey player
- Jonas Bergström (born 1946), Swedish actor
- Jonas Bering (born 1975), Musical artist
- Jonas Berkeley, Musical artist
- Jonas Bernholm (born 1946), Swedish record producer
- Jonas Bevacqua (1977–2011), American clothing designer and entrepreneur
- Jonas Biliūnas (1879–1907), Lithuanian writer
- Jonas Biržiškis (1932–2025), Lithuanian politician
- Jonas Bjerre (born 1976), Musical artist
- Jonas Buhl Bjerre (born 2004), Danish chess grandmaster
- Jonas Björkman (born 1972), Swedish tennis player and coach
- Jonas Björler (born 1973), Swedish bassist
- Jonas Bjurström (born 1979), Swedish footballer
- Jonas Blaymire, 18th-century Irish draughtsman
- Jonas Blixt (born 1984), Swedish professional golfer
- Jonas Bloch (born 1939), Brazilian actor
- Jonas Bloquet (born 1992), Belgian actor and film director
- Jonas Blue (born 1989), English DJ and producer
- Jonas of Bobbio (0600–0659), Columbanian monk
- Jonas Axel Boeck (1833–1873), Norwegian marine biologist
- Jonas Bokeloh (born 1996), German cyclist
- Jonas Bondi (1804–1874), German-American rabbi and newspaper editor
- Jonas Bonnier (born 1963), Swedish author
- Jonas Borring (born 1985), Danish footballer
- Jonas Algimantas Boruta (1944–2022), Lithuanian Roman Catholic prelate
- Jonas Bösiger (born 1995), Swiss snowboarder
- Jonas Brammen (born 1997), German footballer
- Jonas Brändle (born 2000), German footballer
- Jonas Bretkūnas (1536–1602), Prussian Lutheran pastor and writer
- Jonas Brodin (born 1993), Swedish ice hockey player
- Jonas Bronck (1600–1643), Namesake of Bronx, New York
- Jonas Brorsson (born 1963), Swedish footballer
- Jonas Brunvoll Jr. (1920–1982), Norwegian opera singer and actor
- Jonas Brunvoll Sr. (1894–1969), Norwegian advertising manager
- Jonas Bruun (1911–1977), Danish Supreme Court attorney
- Jonas Budde (1644–1710), Danish-Norwegian army officer
- Jonas Budrys (1889–1964), Lithuanian counterintelligence officer
- Jonas Burba (1907–1952), Lithuanian artist
- Jonas Burgert (born 1969), German artist
- Jonas Buud (born 1974), Swedish long-distance runner
- Jonas Bužinskas (1917–1948), Lithuanian footballer
- Jonas Bylund (born 1963), Swedish musician
- Jonas Chollet (born 2008), French snowboarder
- Jonas Cronert (born 1980), Swedish politician
- Jonas Deichmann, German adventurer, ultra-endurance athlete
- Jonas Dünzel (born 1994), German politician
- Jonas Eriksson, several people
- Jonas Folger, German motorbike racer
- Jonas Galusha, American politician and 5th governor of Vermont
- Jonas Gardell, Swedish writer and comedian
- Jonas Gelsen, German rower
- Jonas Green, Colonial American newspaper publisher
- Jonas C. Greenfield, American scholar of Semitic languages
- Jonas Griffith (born 1997), American football player
- Jonas Grof, German basketball player
- Jonas Gunnarsson, several people
- Jonas Gustavsson, NHL goaltender
- Jonás Gutiérrez, Argentine footballer
- Jonas Haggren, Swedish Navy rear admiral
- Jónas Hallgrímsson, Icelandic poet, author and naturalist
- Jonas Hector, German footballer
- Jonas Hellborg, Swedish bass player
- Jonas Hiller, Swiss NHL goaltender
- Jonas Hjort, economist
- Jonas Höglund, NHL hockey player
- Jonas H. Ingram (1886–1952), US Navy admiral and Medal of Honor recipient
- Jonas Ivanauskas (born 1960), Lithuanian priest
- Jonas Ivens (born 1984), Belgian footballer
- Jonas Jablonskis (1860–1930), Lithuanian linguist
- Jonas Jacobsson (born 1965), Swedish Paralympic sport shooter
- Jonas Jakimavičius (1889–1945), Lithuanian politician
- Jonas Jaknavičius (1589–1668), Lithuanian lexicographer
- Jonas Jansen (1900–1975), Norwegian archivist
- Jonas Jarutis (born 1963), Lithuanian politician
- Jonas Jeberg (born 1975), Danish songwriter and music producer
- Jonas Jennings (born 1977), American football player and coach
- Jonas Jensen-Abbew (born 2002), Danish footballer
- Jonas Jensen (born 1985), Danish footballer
- Jonas Jeppesen (born 1998), Danish speedway rider
- Jonas Jerebko (born 1987), Swedish basketball player
- Jonas af Jochnick (1937–2019), Swedish businessman
- Jonas Johansen (born 1985), Norwegian footballer
- Jonas Johansson (ice hockey, born 1982), Swedish ice hockey player
- Jonas Johansson (ice hockey, born 1984), Swedish ice hockey player
- Jonas Johansson (ice hockey, born 1995), Swedish ice hockey player
- Jonas Johnson (born 1970), Swedish ice hockey player
- Jonas Jonas (born 1993), Namibian boxer
- Jonas Jonasson (born 1961), Swedish journalist and writer
- Jonas Jones (1791–1848), Canadian politician
- Jonas Jonsson (19th-century builder) (1806–1885), Swedish architect
- Jonas Jonsson (footballer) (born 1975), Swedish footballer
- Jonas Jonsson (sailor) (1873–1926), Swedish sailor
- Jonas Jonsson (sport shooter) (1903–1996), Swedish sport shooter
- Jonas Aaen Jørgensen (born 1986), Danish racing cyclist
- Jonas Junkka (born 1975), Swedish ice hockey player
- Jonas Junland (born 1987), Swedish ice hockey player
- Jonas Juška (1815–1886), Lithuanian teacher and linguist
- Jonas Kaufmann, German opera singer
- Jonas Kyratzes, writer and game designer
- Jonas Lund, Swedish conceptual artist
- Jonas Lüscher, Swiss-German writer and essayist
- Jonas Mačiulis, a Lithuanian basketball player
- Jonas Mekas, Lithuanian film maker
- Jonas Millard (born 1981), Swedish politician
- Jonas of Orléans (760–841), Bishop of Orléans
- Jonas Gonçalves Oliveira, Brazilian international footballer
- Jonas Pangonis (born 1950), Lithuanian politician
- Jonas Parello-Plesner (born 1973), Danish foreign policy analyst
- Jonas Pate (born 1970), American writer & director
- Jonas Paukštė (born 2000), Lithuanian basketball player
- Jonas Paulavičius (1898–1952), Lithuanian carpenter
- Jonas Pedersen (1871–1953), Norwegian politician
- Jonas Pelgander (born 1975), Swedish footballer
- Jonas Persson (cyclist) (1913–1986), Swedish cyclist
- Jonas Persson (football executive), Swedish businessman and football executive
- Jonas Persson (handballer) (born 1969), Swedish handball player
- Jonas Persson (swimmer) (born 1983), Swedish swimmer
- Jonas C. Peters (born 1971), American inorganic chemist
- Jonas Phijffers (born 2003), Dutch athlete
- Jonas Phillips (1736–1803), American merchant
- Jonas B. Phillips (1805–1869), American attorney
- Jonas P. Phoenix (1788–1859), American politician
- Jonas Pierre (born 1980), American basketball player
- Jonas Pilling (1855–1926), British vicar
- Jonas Pinskus (born 1959), Lithuanian rower
- Jonas Pipynė (1935–1997), Lithuanian Olympic runner
- Jonas Plass (born 1986), German sprinter
- Jonas Platt (1769–1834), American politician
- Jonas M. Platt (1919–2000), U.S. Marine Corps major general
- Jonas Pleškys (1935–1993), Soviet naval commander
- Jonas Pohlmann (born 1996), German politician
- Jonas Poole (1566–1612), English explorer and sealer
- Jonas Portin (born 1986), Finnish footballer
- Jonas Kældsø Poulsen (born 1985), Danish windsurfer
- Jonas Prapiestis (born 1952), Lithuanian politician
- Jonas Prising (born 1965), CEO
- Jonas Proast (1640–1710), English priest and academic
- Jonas Profit, English mariner and explorer
- Jonas Puzinas (1905–1978), Lithuanian archaeologist
- Jonás Ramalho, Spanish-Angolan footballer
- Jonas Reckermann, German beach volleyball player
- Jonas Renkse, Singer of Swedish band Katatonia
- Jonas Sakuwaha (born 1983), Zambian footballer
- Jonas Salk (1914–1995), American inventor of the polio vaccine
- Jonas Salley (born 1982), Ivorian-Australian soccer player
- Jonas Salsicha (born 1994), Brazilian professional kickboxer
- Jonas Samuelsson (born 1991), Swedish handball player
- Jonas Sandell (born 1995), Swedish ski jumper
- Jonas Sandqvist (born 1981), Swedish former professional footballer
- Jonas Sanker (born 2002), American football player
- Jonas Savimbi (1934–2002), Angolan politician and rebel leader
- Jonas Andersen Sayed (born 1997), Norwegian politician
- Jonas Schmidt-Chanasit (born 1979), German virologist
- Jonas Schmidt (born 1973), Danish self-taught actor and comedian
- Jonas Scholz (born 1999), German footballer
- Jonas Schomburg (born 1994), German triathlete
- Jonas Schön (born 1969), Swedish speed skater
- Jonas Schützeberg (born 1984), German lightweight rower
- Jonas Seawright (born 1982), American football player
- Jonas Seifert-Salk (born 2000), Danish speedway rider
- Jonas Sela (born 1984), German footballer
- Jonas Semaška (1907–1947), Lithuanian partisan leader
- Jonas Sibanyoni (born 1952), South African politician and lawyer
- Jonas Sibley (1762–1834), American politician
- Jonas Siegenthaler (born 1997), Swiss ice hockey player
- Jonas Sima (born 1937), Swedish writer
- Jonas Sjölander (born 1965), Swedish male curler
- Jonas Sjöstedt (born 1964), Swedish politician
- Jonas Howden Sjøvaag (born 1978), Norwegian jazz drummer
- Jonas Slier (1886–1942), Dutch artistic gymnast
- Jonas Smalakys (1835–1901), Prussian Lithuanian landowner and soldier
- Jonas Smilgevičius (1870–1942), Lithuanian economist and politician
- Jonas Smulders (born 1994), Dutch film and television actor
- Jonas Snäckmark (born 1986), Swedish metal singer
- Jonas Söderlund (born 1971), Swedish organizational theorist
- Jonas Sonnenberg (born 1993), German association football player
- Jonas Sparring (born 1988), Swedish ice hockey player
- Jonas Staal (born 1981), Dutch artist
- Jonas Stafford (born 2005), Irish athlete
- Jonas Stark (born 1972), Swedish footballer
- Jonas Stark (pianist) (born 1998), German pianist
- Jonas Staugaitis (1868–1952), Lithuanian politician
- Jonas Van de Steene (born 1987), Belgian para-cyclist
- Jonas Steponavičius (1880–1947), Lithuanian Roman Catholic priest
- Jonas Sterner (born 2002), German footballer
- Jonas Steur (born 1982), Belgian trance DJ and producer
- Jonas Rimantas Stonis (born 1958), Soft redirect to Wikispecies
- Jonas Gahr Støre (born 1960), Prime Minister of Norway since 2021
- Jonas Henry Støre (1888–1974), Norwegian business executive
- Jonas Strifler (born 1990), German footballer
- Jonas Strömberg (born 2001), American handball player
- Jonas Struß (born 1997), German footballer
- Jonas Sultan (born 1991), Filipino boxer
- Jonas Sulzbach (born 1986), Brazilian model
- Jonas Erikson Sundahl (1678–1762), Swedish architect
- Jonas Suyderhoef (1613–1686), Dutch Golden Age engraver
- Jonas Svensson (bandy) (born 1983), Swedish bandy player
- Jonas Svensson (footballer) (born 1993), Norwegian footballer
- Jonas Svensson (tennis) (born 1966), Swedish tennis player
- Jonas Swenholt (1855–1923), American politician
- Jonas Swensson (1828–1873), American Lutheran clergyman
- Jonas March Tebbetts (1820–1913), American politician
- Jonas Tomalty, Canadian rock musician from Montréal
- Jonas Torsvik (born 2005), Norwegian footballer
- Jonas Vaitkus, lecturer and film director in Lithuania
- Jonas Valančiūnas (born 1992), Lithuanian basketball player
- Jonas Vileišis, Lithuanian lawyer, politician, and diplomat
- Jonas Vingegaard, Danish cyclist
- Jonas Wikman, Swedish officer
- Jonas Wikström, Swedish Navy officer
- Jonas Williams (born 2008), American football player
- Jonas Wind, Danish footballer
- Jonas Wohlfarth-Bottermann (born 1990), German basketball player
- Jhonas Enroth, Swedish ice hockey player

== Notable people with the surname ==
- Abraham Jonas (politician), politician
- Abraham Jonas (rugby league), rugby player
- Alberto Jonás, pianist
- Ann Jonas, writer
- Benjamin F. Jonas, politician
- Billy Jonas, folk musician
- Bruno Jonas, German political cabaret artist
- Charles Jonas (Wisconsin politician) (1840–1896), Czech-American journalist, politician and diplomat
- Charles A. Jonas (1876–1955), American politician
- Charles R. Jonas (1904–1988), American politician
- Clemens Jonas, figure skater
- Danielle Jonas, wife of Kevin
- Don Jonas, American footballer
- Dusty Jonas, high jumper
- Edgar A. Jonas, politician
- Émile Jonas (1827–1905), French composer
- Fran Jonas (born 2004), New Zealand cricketer
- Frankie Jonas, brother of Nick
- Franz Jonas, politician, President of Austria
- Gavin Jonas, South African politician
- George Jonas (1935–2016), Canadian-Hungarian writer
- George E. Jonas (1897–1978), American businessman
- Gilbert Jonas (1930–2006), American activist
- Glenn Jonas (born 1970), New Zealand cricketer
- Hans Jonas, philosopher
- Harry Jonas, international lawyer
- Howard Jonas, businessman
- Israel Heymann Jonas (1795–1851), German malacologist
- Joan Jonas, artist
- John Jonas, metallurgist
- Johnny Jonas, British painter
- Joseph Jonas (disambiguation), several people, including
  - Joseph Jonas (1845–1921), German-born Lord Mayor of Sheffield
- Justina Jonas, Namibia politician
- Justus Jonas, Protestant reformer
- Kevin Jonas, musician, member of Jonas Brothers
- Lihen Jonas, Micronesian sprinter
- Louis Paul Jonas, sculptor, museum exhibit designer, taxidermist
- Margarete Jonas (1898–1976), First Lady of Austria
- Maria Jonas (1957–2024), German opera singer
- Marie Jonas (1893–1944), German physician and Holocaust victim
- Mark Jonas (born 1974), American soccer player and coach
- Maryla Jonas (1911–1959), Polish musician
- Mcebisi Jonas (born 1960), South African politician and businessman
- Milton Jonas (1926–2006), American politician
- Natasha Jonas, boxer
- Nathan S. Jonas (1868–1943), American banker and philanthropist
- Nick Jonas, musician, member of Jonas Brothers
- Peter Jonas (director) (1946–2020), British arts administrator
- Peter Jonas (figure skater) (born 1941), Austrian figure skater
- Peter Jonas (footballer) (born 1959), Australian rules footballer
- Priyanka Jonas, Indian actress, model and film producer
- Regina Jonas (1902–1944), First woman to be ordained as a rabbi
- Roberto Jonas (born 1967), Andorran footballer
- Shadreck Jonas, Malawian politician
- Tiago Jonas (born 1983), Portuguese footballer
- Tina W. Jonas, American undersecretary of defense
- Tom Jonas (born 1991), Australian rules footballer
- Travis Jonas (born 1975), American poker player
- Wayne Jonas, American physician
- William Jonas (1890–1916), English footballer

== Fictional characters ==
- Eldred Jonas, character from the novel Wizard and Glass by Stephen King
- Jonas, the main character in The Giver by Lois Lowry
- Jonas, a character in the online serial lonelygirl15
- Jonas Blane, one of the lead characters in the American TV show The Unit
- Jonas Glim, DC Comics character
- Jonas Graymalkin, Marvel Comics character
- Jonas Grumby, the Skipper from the TV sitcom Gilligan's Island
- Jonas Harrow, Marvel Comics character
- Jonas Hodges, a villain in Season 7 of the TV series 24
- Jonas Morecock, a gay pornographic animated character
- Jonas Quinn, character in the sci-fi series Stargate SG-1
- Michael Jonas, character in the sci-fi series Star Trek: Voyager
- Vision (Jonas), Marvel Comics character

== See also ==
- Jonas (disambiguation)
