= 2012 IIHF Inline Hockey World Championship Division I =

International sports tournament

Tournament details
- Host country: Germany
- Venues: 2 (in 1 host city)
- Dates: 1 June – 7 June
- Teams: 8

Tournament statistics
- Games played: 23
- Goals scored: 264 (11.48 per game)
- Attendance: 3,934 (171 per game)
- Scoring leader: (Slovakia) Marcel Holovic

The 2012 IIHF InLine Hockey World Championship Division I was an international inline hockey tournament run by the International Ice Hockey Federation. The Division I tournament ran alongside the 2012 IIHF InLine Hockey World Championship and took place between 1 and 7 June 2012 in Ingolstadt, Germany. The tournament was won by Slovakia who upon winning gained promotion to the 2013 IIHF Inline Hockey World Championship. While Bulgaria and New Zealand were relegated after finishing last and second last respectively.

== Qualification ==
Six teams attempted to qualify for the two remaining spots in the 2012 IIHF InLine Hockey World Championship Division I tournament. The other six nations automatically qualified after their results from the 2011 World Championship and the 2011 Division I tournaments. Two qualification tournaments were held with a place awarded to the winner of each tournament. The European Qualification tournament was contested between Bulgaria, Macedonia and Turkey, with Bulgaria winning both of their games and earning a qualification spot. The Rest of the World Qualification tournament was contested between Chinese Taipei, New Zealand and South Africa, with New Zealand winning promotion.

- Australia − Finished fourth in 2011 World Championship Division I
- Austria − Finished third in 2011 World Championship Division I
- Bulgaria − Winner of the European Qualification
- Croatia − Finished fifth in 2011 World Championship Division I
- Hungary − Finished second in 2011 World Championship Division I
- Japan − Returned to competition after a year out due to force majeure
- New Zealand − Winner of the Rest of the World Qualification
- Slovakia − Relegated from the 2011 World Championship

=== European Qualification ===
The European Qualification tournament was held at the Winter Palace in Sofia, Bulgaria from 2 September 2011 to 4 September 2011. Bulgaria gained promotion to Division I after winning both of their games against Macedonia and Turkey. Turkey finished in second place after they won their other game against the Macedonian team.

Team	Pld	W	OTW	OTL	L	GF	GA	GD	Pts	Qualification
Bulgaria	2	2	0	0	0	37	6	+31	6	Qualified for Division I
Turkey	2	1	0	0	1	24	11	+13	3	
North Macedonia	2	0	0	0	2	4	48	−44	0	

All times are local.

2 September 2011; 20:00	North Macedonia	2 – 20 (0–7, 0–5, 1–3, 1–5)	Turkey	Winter Palace

Game reference

3 September 2011; 18:00	Bulgaria	28 – 2 (6–1, 9–0, 4–1, 9–0)	North Macedonia	Winter Palace

Game reference

4 September 2011; 14:00	Turkey	4 – 9 (0–2, 1–2, 1–2, 2–3)	Bulgaria	Winter Palace

Game reference

=== Rest of the World Qualification ===
The Rest of the World Qualification tournament was held at the New Plymouth Rollersports Arena in New Plymouth, New Zealand from 18 November 2011 to 20 November 2011. New Zealand gained promotion to Division I after winning both of their games against Chinese Taipei and South Africa. Chinese Taipei finished in second place after they won their other game against the South African team.

Team	Pld	W	OTW	OTL	L	GF	GA	GD	Pts	Qualification
New Zealand	2	2	0	0	0	18	4	+14	6	Qualified for Division I
Chinese Taipei	2	1	0	0	1	7	16	−9	3	
South Africa	2	0	0	0	2	8	13	−5	0	

All times are local.

18 November 2011; 19:30	Chinese Taipei	1 – 11 (0–4, 0–3, 1–2, 0–2)	New Zealand	New Plymouth Rollersports Arena

Game reference

19 November 2011; 19:30	South Africa	5 – 6 (1–1, 2–2, 1–1, 1–2)	Chinese Taipei	New Plymouth Rollersports Arena

Game reference

20 November 2011; 16:30	New Zealand	7 – 3 (1–2, 4–1, 1–0, 1–0)	South Africa	New Plymouth Rollersports Arena

Game reference

== Seeding and groups ==
The seeding in the preliminary round was based on the final standings at the 2011 IIHF InLine Hockey World Championship and 2011 IIHF InLine Hockey World Championship Division I. Division I's groups are named Group C and Group D while the 2012 IIHF InLine Hockey World Championship use Group A and Group B, as both tournaments are held in Ingolstadt, Germany. The teams were grouped accordingly by seeding at the previous year's tournament (in parentheses is the corresponding seeding):

Group C

- Slovakia (9)
- Australia (12)
- Croatia (13)
- Bulgaria (16)

Group D

- Hungary (10)
- Austria (11)
- Japan (14)
- New Zealand (15)

== Preliminary round ==
Eight participating teams were placed in the following two groups. After playing a round-robin, every team advanced to the Playoff round.

All times are local (UTC+2).

=== Group C ===
Team	Pld	W	OTW	OTL	L	GF	GA	GD	Pts
Slovakia	3	3	0	0	0	42	6	+36	9
Croatia	3	2	0	0	1	23	13	+10	6
Australia	3	1	0	0	2	17	20	−3	3
Bulgaria	3	0	0	0	3	3	46	−43	0

1 June 2012; 15:00	Australia	4 – 5 (2–3, 1–0, 0–1, 1–1)	Croatia	Saturn Rink 2 Attendance: 93

Game reference

1 June 2012; 17:00	Bulgaria	0 – 21 (0–7, 0–3, 0–9, 0–2)	Slovakia	Saturn Rink 2 Attendance: 108

Game reference

2 June 2012; 13:00	Australia	9 – 1 (0–0, 2–1, 2–0, 5–0)	Bulgaria	Saturn Rink 2 Attendance: 50

Game reference

2 June 2012; 17:00	Slovakia	7 – 2 (2–1, 1–0, 2–0, 2–1)	Croatia	Saturn Rink 2 Attendance: 75

Game reference

3 June 2012; 13:00	Croatia	16 – 2 (5–1, 2–0, 3–0, 6–1)	Bulgaria	Saturn Rink 2 Attendance: 127

Game reference

3 June 2012; 17:00	Slovakia	14 – 4 (5–1, 5–0, 1–3, 3–0)	Australia	Saturn Rink 2 Attendance: 314

Game reference

=== Group D ===
Team	Pld	W	OTW	OTL	L	GF	GA	GD	Pts
Hungary	3	3	0	0	0	22	7	+15	9
Austria	3	2	0	0	1	27	14	+13	6
Japan	3	0	1	0	2	12	18	−6	2
New Zealand	3	0	0	1	2	4	26	−22	1

1 June 2012; 15:00	Austria	14 – 2 (3–0, 4–0, 3–1, 4–1)	Japan	Saturn Rink 2 Attendance: 93

Game reference

1 June 2012; 19:00	New Zealand	3 – 7 (1–2, 0–2, 0–0, 2–3)	Hungary	Saturn Rink 2 Attendance: 98

Game reference

2 June 2012; 15:00	Austria	9 – 6 (4–1, 2–0, 2–2, 1–3)	New Zealand	Saturn Rink 2 Attendance: 235

Game reference

2 June 2012; 19:00	Hungary	9 – 0 (3–0, 2–0, 0–0, 4–0)	Japan	Saturn Rink 2 Attendance: 45

Game reference

3 June 2012; 15:00	Japan	2 – 3 (0–1, 1–0, 1–1, 0–0, 0–0, 0–1)	New Zealand	Saturn Rink 2 Attendance: 318

Game reference

3 June 2012; 19:00	Hungary	6 – 4 (0–1, 1–2, 2–0, 3–1)	Austria	Saturn Rink 2 Attendance: 267

Game reference

== Playoff round ==
All eight teams advanced into the playoff round and were seeded into the quarterfinals according to their result in the preliminary round. The winning quarterfinalists advanced through to the semifinals, while the losing teams moved through to the placement round. Bulgaria and New Zealand were relegated after losing their placement round games, while Australia and Japan advanced to a 5/6 placement game with Australia defeating Japan 7–3. In the semifinals Hungary defeated Austria and Slovakia defeating Croatia, both advancing to the final. After losing the semifinals Austria and Croatia played off for the bronze medal with Austria winning in overtime. Slovakia defeated Hungary 5–4 in the final and earned promotion to the 2013 IIHF Inline Hockey World Championship.

Quarterfinals
D2	Austria	7
C3	Australia	2
D1	Hungary	12
C4	Bulgaria	2
C1	Slovakia	14
D3	Japan	0
C2	Croatia	5
D4	New Zealand	0

Semifinals
QF1	Hungary	5
QF2	Austria	2
QF3	Slovakia	5
QF4	Croatia	3

Finals
SF1	Hungary	4
SF2	Slovakia	5
Bronze medal game
SF1	Austria	7
SF2	Croatia	6

=== Quarterfinals ===
All times are local (UTC+2).

5 June 2012; 13:00	Croatia	5 – 0 (2–0, 1–0, 1–0, 1–0)	New Zealand	Saturn Rink 2 Attendance: 128

Game reference

5 June 2012; 15:00	Austria	7 – 2 (2–1, 1–0, 1–1, 3–0)	Australia	Saturn Rink 2 Attendance: 193

Game reference

5 June 2012; 17:00	Slovakia	14 – 0 (0–0, 5–0, 5–0, 4–0)	Japan	Saturn Rink 2 Attendance: 208

Game reference

5 June 2012; 19:00	Hungary	12 – 2 (1–0, 3–1, 5–0, 3–1)	Bulgaria	Saturn Rink 2 Attendance: 231

Game reference

=== Placement round ===
6 June 2012; 13:00	New Zealand	2 – 3 (0–1, 0–1, 1–1, 1–0)	Japan	Saturn Rink 2 Attendance: 93

Game reference

6 June 2012; 15:00	Australia	16 – 4 (4–2, 2–0, 6–2, 4–0)	Bulgaria	Saturn Rink 2 Attendance: 93

Game reference

==== 5/6 placement ====
7 June 2012; 10:00	Australia	7 – 3 (1–0, 2–1, 2–1, 2–1)	Japan	Saturn Rink 2 Attendance: 123

Game reference

=== Semifinals ===
6 June 2012; 17:00	Hungary	5 – 2 (0–1, 3–0, 0–1, 2–0)	Austria	Saturn Rink 2 Attendance: 118

Game reference

6 June 2012; 19:00	Slovakia	5 – 3 (2–0, 0–1, 1–1, 2–1)	Croatia	Saturn Rink 2 Attendance: 193

Game reference

=== Third place game ===
7 June 2012; 12:00	Austria	7 – 6 (OT) (1–3, 3–1, 1–1, 1–1, 1–0)	Croatia	Saturn Rink 2 Attendance: 331

Game reference

=== Final ===
7 June 2012; 14:00	Slovakia	5 – 4 (1–1, 4–1, 0–2, 0–0)	Hungary	Saturn Arena; Attendance: 400

Game reference

== Ranking and statistics ==
=== Standings ===
The final standings of the tournament according to IIHF:

Rk.	Team
1.	Slovakia
2.	Hungary
3.	Austria
4.	Croatia
5.	Australia
6.	Japan
7.	New Zealand
8.	Bulgaria

=== Tournament Awards ===
- Best players selected by the directorate:
  - Best Goalkeeper: (Hungary) Tamas Kiss
  - Best Defenseman: (Austria) Gerd Gruber
  - Best Forward: (Slovakia) Roman Simunek

=== Scoring leaders ===
List shows the top skaters sorted by points, then goals. If the list exceeds 10 skaters because of a tie in points, all of the tied skaters are shown.

Player	GP	G	A	Pts	+/-	PIM	POS
(Slovakia) Marcel Holovic	6	7	16	23	+19	0.0	F
(Slovakia) Filip Novak	6	12	10	22	+19	3.0	F
(Austria) Daniel Oberkofler	6	8	12	20	+11	1.5	F
(Slovakia) Lukas Ruzicka	6	6	14	20	+18	3.0	F
(Slovakia) Tomas Jasko	6	8	11	19	+17	0.0	F
(Australia) Jonathon Bremner	6	10	7	17	+6	3.0	F
(Austria) Harry Lange	6	7	9	16	+14	7.5	D
(Slovakia) Roman Simunek	6	7	9	16	+17	0.0	F
(Slovakia) Peter Sojcik	6	7	9	16	+17	4.5	F
(Hungary) Arnold Feil	6	8	7	15	+12	1.5	F

=== Leading goaltenders ===
Only the top five goaltenders, based on save percentage, who have played at least 40% of their team's minutes are included in this list.

Player	MIP	SOG	GA	GAA	SVS%	SO
(Slovakia) Vladimir Neumann	120:00	52	2	0.60	96.15	2
(Hungary) Tamas Kiss	166:17	85	6	1.30	92.94	1
(Slovakia) Roman Hrusovsky	144:00	97	11	2.75	88.66	0
(Austria) Lorenz Hirn	237:50	144	19	2.88	86.81	0
(Croatia) Vanja Belic	228:53	150	20	3.15	86.67	1

== See also ==
- 2012 IIHF InLine Hockey World Championship
