= Brignoni =

Brignoni is an Italian surname. Notable people with the surname include:

- Jonas Brignoni Dos Santos (born 1983), Brazilian football player
- Luis Brignoni (born 1953), Puerto Rican basketball player
- Nicolas Brignoni (born 197), Uruguayan rugby player
- Serge Brignoni (1903–2002), Swiss painter and sculptor

== Other ==
- United States v. Brignoni-Ponce, a 1975 court case
