= Jonas =

Jonas may refer to:

== Geography ==
- Jonas, Netherlands, Netherlands
- Jonas, Pennsylvania, United States
- Jonas Ridge, North Carolina, United States

== Arts, entertainment, and media ==
- Jonas Brothers, American pop rock band
  - Jonas (TV series), a television series starring the Jonas Brothers
- Jonas (novel), a 1955 novel by Jens Bjørneboe
- Jonas, a character in The Giver by Lois Lowry
- Jonas, an oratorio by Italian composer Giacomo Carissimi
- I Am Jonas, a 2018 French film, original title Jonas
- Jonas, a character in Dark, a German television series produced by Netflix

== Religion ==
- Jonah or Jonas, a prophet in the Hebrew Bible
- Jonas, one of two Jeneum (figures in the Book of Mormon)

== People ==
- Jonas (name), people with the given name or surname Jonas
- Jonas (footballer, born 1943), full name Jonas Bento de Carvalho, Brazilian football midfielder
- Jonas (footballer, born 1972), full name Carlos Emanuel Romeu Lima, Angolan football midfielder
- Jonas (footballer, born 1983), full name Jonas Brignoni dos Santos, Brazilian football defender
- Jonas (footballer, born 1984), full name Jonas Gonçalves Oliveira, Brazilian football forward
- Jonas (footballer, born 1987), full name Jonas Jessue da Silva Júnior, Brazilian football defender
- Jonas (footballer, born 1991), full name Jonas Gomes de Sousa, Brazilian football midfielder

== Other uses ==
- Storm Jonas, January 2016 United States winter storm
- Jonas (crab), a genus of crustaceans in the family Corystidae
