= Jonah (given name) =

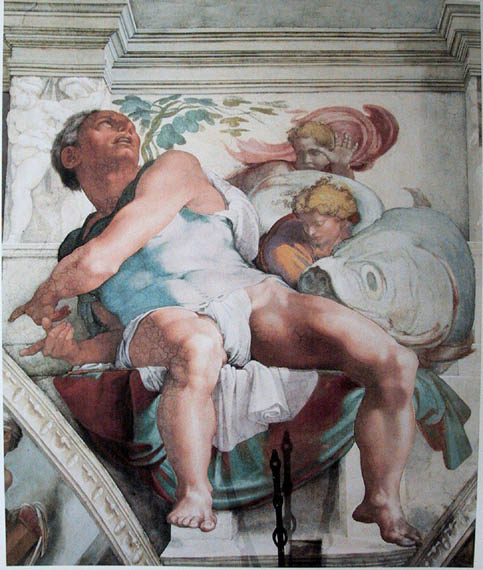
- Jonah
- Pronunciation: /ˈdʒoʊnə/
- Gender: Male

Origin
- Origin: Hebrew
- Meaning: Dove; Pigeon

Other names
- Related names: Giona, Jonas, Yunus, Yonah

Jonah is a masculine given name derived from the Hebrew: יוֹנָה, Yonā, meaning dove or pigeon. It is the name of the Abrahamic prophet Jonah.

== Etymology ==
Jonah most often represents Hebrew יוֹנָה (Yōnā) meaning 'dove', the name of multiple Biblical figures.

== Jonah in other languages ==
- Giona (Italian)
- Jonàs (Catalan)
- Jona (Croatian)
- Jonáš (Czech)
- Jonah (English)
- Jonas (German, Swedish, Latin, Lithuanian and Portuguese)
- Jónás (Hungarian)
- Jónas (Icelandic)
- Jonasz (Polish)
- Jonaš (Prekmurje dialect of Slovene)
- Jonáš (Slovak)
- Jona (Slovene)
- Jonás (Spanish)
- Yonah or Yona (יונה) (Hebrew and Yiddish)
- Yunus (Turkish)
- Younes (يونس) (Arabic)
- Joonas (Estonian and Finnish)
- Joona (Finnish)
- Yunsi (Berber)
- Ionas (Ίωνας) (Greek)
- Jona (Yoruba)
- Yunan (Syriac)

== People ==
- Jonah of Hankou (1888–1925), bishop of Hankou of the Russian Orthodox Church Outside Russia
- Jonah of Moscow (died 1461), Metropolitan of Kiev and All Rus'
- Jonah Anguka, Kenyan author
- Jonah Ayunga, Kenyan football player
- Jonah Barrington (journalist), English journalist
- Jonah Barrington (judge), Irish judge and politician
- Jonah Barrington (squash player), English squash player
- Jonah Bayliss, American baseball player
- Jonah Berger, American marketing professor
- Jonah Blechman, American actor
- Jonah Blank, American journalist
- Jonah Bobo, American child actor
- Jonah Bokaer, American media artist
- Jonah Bolden, Australian basketball player
- Jonah Burt, Canadian judoka
- Jonah Coleman (born 2003), American football player
- Jonah David Jang, Nigerian politician
- Jonah Edelman, American advocate for public education reform
- Jonah Falcon, American actor and writer
- Jonah Feingold, American writer of short films
- Jonah Frankel, Israeli writer
- Yonah Gerondi, Catalan rabbi and moralist
- Jonah Goldberg, American conservative political commentator
- Jonah Hill, American actor and writer
- Jonah Holmes, English rugby player
- Jonah Jackson (born 1997), American football player
- Jonah Jones, American jazz trumpeter
- Jonah Jones (sculptor), Welsh artist
- Jonah Keri, Canadian journalist
- Jonah Kim, South Korean cellist
- Jonah Koslen, American singer-songwriter
- Jonah Kūhiō Kalanianaʻole, Prince of Hawai'i and American politician
- Jonah Kumalae, Hawaiian politician and ukulele manufacturer
- Jonah Laulu (born 2000), American football player
- Jonah Lehrer, American science author and journalist
- Jonah Lomu, New Zealand rugby player
- Jonah Lowe, New Zealand rugby player
- Jonah Lotan, Israeli actor
- Jonah Matranga, American singer and songwriter
- Yona Melnik, Israeli judoka
- Jonah Meyerson, American actor
- Jonah Monheim (born 2002), American football player
- Metropolitan Jonah Paffhausen, primate of the Orthodox Church in America
- Jonah Parzen-Johnson, American saxophonist
- Jonah Peretti, co-founder of Buzzfeed and The Huffington Post
- Jonah Piʻikoi, Hawaiian nobleman and politician
- Jonah Raskin, American writer
- Jonah Ray, American comedian
- Jonah Rock, former ring name of Australian professional wrestler Jermaine Haley (born 1988)
- Jonah Rockoff, American economist
- Jonah Sanford, American politician and Union Army colonel
- Jonah Savaiinaea (born 2004), American football player
- Jonah Sharp, American electronic music producer
- Jonah Sithole, Zimbabwean guitarist
- Jonah Sticker (born 2004), German footballer
- Jonah Williams (disambiguation), multiple people
- Jonah Wise, American rabbi
- Jonah Yano, Canadian musician

== Fictional characters ==
- Jonah Beck, a main character on the Disney Channel series Andi Mack
- Jonah Hex, an American western comic book hero in DC Comics
- J. Jonah Jameson, in Spider-Man comics and movies
- Jonah Marshall, a character from the analog horror series, The Mandela Catalogue
- Jonah Magnus, a character from the horror fiction anthology podcast The Magnus Archives
- Jonah Takalua, a main character in the Australian comedy series Summer Heights High
- Jonah Wizard, a teenage movie star from the 39 Clues series
- Jonah Byrde, character in Netflix TV Show Ozark
- Jonah Simms, character in TV show Superstore
- Jonah Vasquez, a survivor in the video game Dead by Daylight

== Male variants ==
- Giona (Italian)
- Jonàs (Catalan)
- Jona (Croatian)
- Jonáš (Czech)
- Jonah (English)
- Jonas (German, Swedish, Latin, Lithuanian and Portuguese)
- Jónás (Hungarian)
- Jónas (Icelandic)
- Yunus (Indonesian)
- Jonasz (Polish)
- Jonaš (Prekmurje Slovene)
- Jonáš (Slovak)
- Jona (Slovene)
- Jonás (Spanish)
- Yonah or Yona (יונה) (Hebrew and Yiddish)
- Yunus (Turkish)
- Younes (يونس) (Arabic)
- Joonas (Estonian and Finnish)
- Joona (Finnish)
- Yunsi (Berber)
- Ionas (Ίωνας) (Greek)
- Yunis (Azerbaijani)
- Iunus (Bengali: ইউনুস)
- Jona (Yoruba)
- Yunan (Syriac)
