= 2011 IIHF InLine Hockey World Championship =

International sports tournament

Tournament details
- Host country: Czech Republic
- Venue(s): 1 (in 1 host city)
- Dates: 19–25 June
- Teams: 8

Final positions
- Champions: Czech Republic (1st title)
- Runner-up: United States
- Third place: Canada
- Fourth place: Sweden

Tournament statistics
- Games played: 23
- Goals scored: 248 (10.78 per game)
- Attendance: 32,224 (1,401 per game)

Official website
- http://www.inlinehockey2011.com/index_eng.asp

The 2011 IIHF InLine Hockey World Championship was the 16th IIHF InLine Hockey World Championship, the premier annual international inline hockey tournament. It took place between 19 and 25 June in the Czech Republic. The games were played in the ČEZ Arena in Pardubice.

== Venue ==
Pardubice
ČEZ Arena
Capacity: 10,194
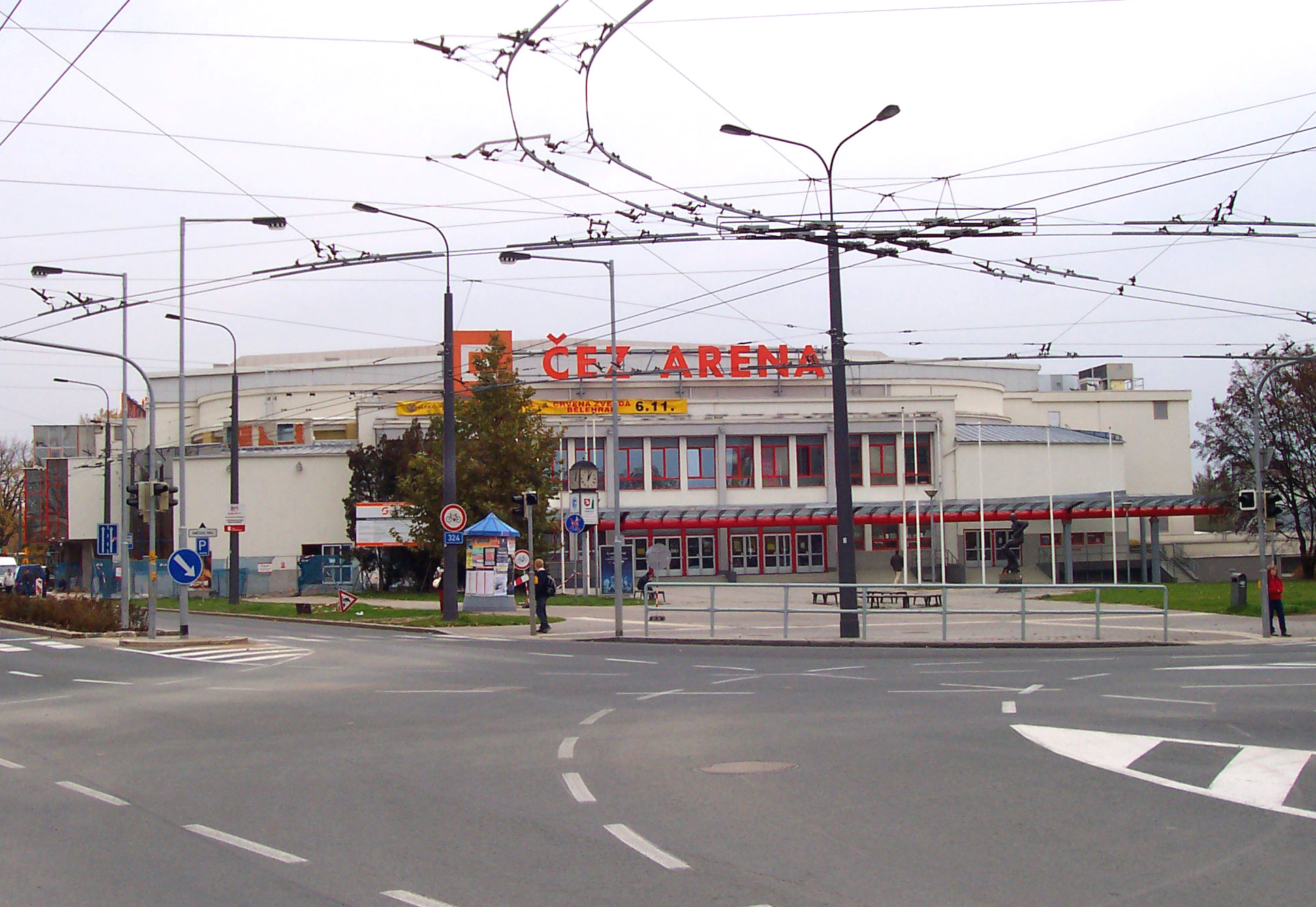

== Nations ==
The following eight nations qualified for the elite-pool tournament. Six nations from Europe, and two nations from North America were represented.

Europe

- Czech Republic (Note: Qualified as hosts)
- Finland (Note: Automatic qualifier after a top 7 placement at the 2010 IIHF InLine Hockey World Championship)
- Germany
- Slovenia
- Slovakia
- Sweden (Note: Qualified after a top placement at the 2010 IIHF InLine Hockey World Championship Division I)

North America

- Canada
- United States

== Seeding and groups ==
The seeding in the preliminary round was based on the final standings at the 2010 IIHF InLine Hockey World Championship and 2010 IIHF InLine Hockey World Championship Division I. The teams were grouped accordingly by seeding at the previous year's tournament (in parentheses is the corresponding seeding):

Group A

- United States (1)
- Canada (4)
- Slovenia (5)
- Slovakia (8)

Group B

- Czech Republic (2)
- Sweden (3)
- Finland (6)
- Germany (7)

== Preliminary round ==
Eight participating teams were placed in the following two groups. After playing a round-robin, every team advanced to the Playoff round.

=== Group A ===
Team	Pld	W	OTW	OTL	L	GF	GA	GD	Pts
United States	3	3	0	0	0	22	8	+14	9
Slovenia	3	2	0	0	1	14	13	+1	6
Canada	3	1	0	0	2	13	15	−2	3
Slovakia	3	0	0	0	3	11	24	−13	0

All times are local (UTC+2).

19 June 2011; 14:00	Canada	4 – 6 (2–0, 0–4, 2–1, 0–1)	Slovenia	ČEZ Arena, Pardubice; Attendance: 100

Game reference

Brett Leggat
Goalies
Gasper Kroselj
Referees:
(United States) Dan Dreger
(Slovakia) Lubos Jakubec

D. Hammond (A. Ross, K. French) – 11:14	1–0
T. Woods (J. Carter) – 11:40	2–0
	2–1	12:36 – M. Kralj (A. Remar) (PP)
	2–2	16:14 – Kralj (D. Zemva)
	2–3	17:15 – Kralj (Remar)
	2–4	21:45 – D. Vedlin (K. Ograjensek, Remar)
Ross (Hammond) – 25:07	3–4
Hammond – 29:25	4–4
	4–5	30:48 – Kralj (Vedlin)
	4–6	38:21 – Remar

6 min
Penalties
3 min
31
Shots
26

19 June 2011; 20:00	Slovakia	3 – 12 (1–2, 1–2, 0–3, 1–5)	United States	ČEZ Arena, Pardubice; Attendance: 450

Game reference

Roman Hrusovsky
Jozef Ondrejka
Goalies
Troy Redmann
Tommy Tartaglione
Referees:
(Slovenia) Crt Kralj
(Australia) Jeffrey Scott

	0–1	00:19 – T. Walser (N. Sigmund, C. Yoder)
M. Kristin (F. Novak) – 02:09	1–1
	1–2	07:11 – Sigmund (SH)
	1–3	15:08 – Yoder (Sigmund, J. Beilsten) (PP)
Kristin (M. Holovic, Novak) – 16:11	2–3
	2–4	19:09 – R. Rodriguez (J Cadiz Jr.)
	2–5	30:32 – Walser (K. Kraemer, J. Doran)
	2–6	33:17 – S. Gawrys (A. Miner, Beilsten) (PP)
	2–7	33:34 – Sigmund (Yoder, Beilsten) (PP)
	2–8	39:18 – Cadiz (Sigmund)
	2–9	41:37 – Walser (Doran)
M. Galik (H. Ruckay) – 42:17	3–9
	3–10	43:26 – Kraemer (Doran)
	3–11	47:10 – Kraemer (Gawrys, G. Osterkamp) (PP)
	3–12	47:24 – Kraemer (Gawrys, Rodriguez)

7.5 min
Penalties
3 min
23
Shots
38

20 June 2011; 14:00	Canada	6 – 3 (1–2, 2–0, 2–0, 1–1)	Slovakia	ČEZ Arena, Pardubice; Attendance: 250

Game reference

Brett Leggat
Goalies
Jozef Ondrejka
Referees:
(Czech Republic) Petr Ulehla
(Germany) Roland Aumueller

M. Grassi (T. Woods) (PP) – 01:43	1–0
	1–1	03:17 – M. Kristin (M. Klucar, P. Novajovsky) (PP)
	1–2	10:13 – Klucar (M. Holovic) (PP)
A. Ross (Grassi) (PP) – 13:02	2–2
K. French (Ross, D. Hammond) – 22:57	3–2
Ross (Grassi, Hammond) (PP) – 30:35	4–2
D. Nowakowaski (G. Hutchinson) – 31:04	5–2
	5–3	46:14 – Klucar (F. Novak) (PP)
Grassi (Hammond) – 47:11	6–3

7.5 min
Penalties
9 min
29
Shots
24

20 June 2011; 20:00	United States	4 – 2 (0–1, 3–0, 1–1, 0–0)	Slovenia	ČEZ Arena, Pardubice; Attendance: 350

Game reference

Tommy Tartaglione
Goalies
Gasper Kroselj
Referees:
(Austria) Ulrich Erd
(Finland) Tony Kuloaro

	0–1	11:39 – D. Vedlin (D. Zemva)
J. Cadiz Jr. (K. Kraemer) – 13:28	1–1
A. Miner (T. Walser) – 14:09	2–1
Cadiz Jr. (R. Rodriguez, Walser) – 23:50	3–1
	3–2	26:03 – Vedlin (M. Erman) (PP)
N. Sigmund (Rodriguez) – 28:53	4–2

9 min
Penalties
6 min
36
Shots
35

21 June 2011; 14:00	Slovenia	6 – 5 (3–1, 2–2, 1–1, 0–1)	Slovakia	ČEZ Arena, Pardubice; Attendance: 300

Game reference

Gasper Kroselj
Goalies
Roman Hrusovsky
Jozef Ondrejka
Referees:
(Germany) Peter Reiter
(Hungary) Balazs Kovacs

M. Erman (D. Zemva) – 01:45	1–0
	1–1	05:11 – R. Simunek (J. Ruckay)
Zemva (D. Vedlin) – 06:20	2–1
A. Kuralt (K. Ograjensek) – 06:59	3–1
D. Slivnik (A. Remar, M. Kralj) (PP) – 13:05	4–1
	4–2	14:32 – Simunek (M. Galik)
	4–3	16:43 – M. Cunderlik (P. Novajovsky, B. Ertel)
Kralj (Remar, J. Loboda) – 22:28	5–3
Zemva (Loboda) (PP) – 30:19	6–3
	6–4	30:46 – Galik (Ruckay)
	6–5	47:57 – H. Ruckay (Novajovsky) (SH)

7.5 min
Penalties
13.5 min
36
Shots
38

21 June 2011; 20:00	United States	6 – 3 (0–1, 4–2, 0–0, 2–0)	Canada	ČEZ Arena, Pardubice; Attendance: 869

Game reference

Troy Redmann
Goalies
Brett Leggat
Referees:
(Czech Republic) Petr Ulehla
(Czech Republic) Radim Prchal

	0–1	04:54 – J. Foote
C. Yoder (I. Chavira) (PP) – 12:12	1–1
Chavira (J. Cadiz Jr., J. Doran) – 14:22	2–1
S. Gawrys (T. Walser, Yoder) – 15:25	3–1
R. Rodriguez (Gawrys) – 16:44	4–1
	4–2	19:50 – D. Hammond (M. Grassi) (PP)
	4–3	20:44 – K. Henderson (D. Nowakowski)
Chavira (J. Beilsten) (PP) – 42:37	5–3
K. Kraemer – 47:44	6–3

1.5 min
Penalties
9 min
29
Shots
16

=== Group B ===
Team	Pld	W	OTW	OTL	L	GF	GA	GD	Pts
Czech Republic	3	3	0	0	0	24	6	+18	9
Finland	3	2	0	0	1	19	18	+1	6
Sweden	3	1	0	0	2	16	23	−7	3
Germany	3	0	0	0	3	13	25	−12	0

All times are local (UTC+2).

19 June 2011; 16:00	Sweden	4 – 10 (1–1, 2–1, 1–1, 0–6)	Finland	ČEZ Arena, Pardubice; Attendance: 350

Game reference

Sebastian Idoff
Goalies
Petri Karhu
Referees:
(Canada) Carl Friday
(Czech Republic) Radim Prchal

K. Luukkonen (E. Bejmo) – 01:42	1–0
	1–1	11:22 – T. Kauppinen (S. Markkanen) (PP)
A. Myren (D. Brolin, Luukkonen) (PP) – 20:55	2–1
	2–2	20:55 – J. Saarinen (K. Lohtander, Markkanen)
Luukkonen (Bejmo) – 21:49	3–2
	3–3	30:00 – M. Jokinen (J. Joki-Erkkila)
	3–4	32:49 – Saarinen (Joki-Erkkila) (PP)
S. Olsson (Idoff) – 35:50	4–4
	4–5	37:36 – Jokinen (J. Aalto) (SH)
	4–6	39:18 – Markkanen (P. Ahosilta, J. Laaksonen)
	4–7	40:57 – M. Palotie (Laaksonen)
	4–8	42:21 – Markkanen (Kauppinen, Jokinen) (PP)
	4–9	43:45 – Aalto (Ahosilta)
	4–10	45:48 – Jokinen (Saarinen) (SH)

17.5 min
Penalties
7.5 min
29
Shots
34

19 June 2011; 18:00	Germany	1 – 9 (0–1, 0–2, 0–5, 1–1)	Czech Republic	ČEZ Arena, Pardubice; Attendance: 2,000

Game reference

Jochen Vollmer
Thomas Ower
Goalies
Roman Handl
Referees:
(Finland) Tony Kuloaro
(Austria) Ulrich Erd

	0–1	09:15 – P. Tenkrat (P. Sebek)
	0–2	14:47 – P. Strycek
	0–3	21:43 – L. Broz (M. Vozdecky)
	0–4	29:59 – Vozdecky (T. Demel, Broz)
	0–5	32:17 – T. Mojzis (Tenkrat)
	0–6	33:14 – K. Rachunek (Vozdecky, Broz)
	0–7	34:58 – V. Kames (Rachunek, Mojzis) (PP)
	0–8	35:41 – Broz (Rachunek, Vozdecky)
	0–9	37:19 – J. Polansky (Strycek) (SH)
T. Greilinger (D. Menge, H. Holscher) – 45:46	1–9

6 min
Penalties
3 min
21
Shots
34

20 June 2011; 16:00	Sweden	9 – 7 (1–1, 4–2, 1–3, 3–1)	Germany	ČEZ Arena, Pardubice; Attendance: 350

Game reference

Jonas Sparring
Sebastian Idoff
Goalies
Jochen Vollmer
Thomas Ower
Referees:
(Slovakia) Norbert Druga
(Finland) Jukka Virta

H. Hoglund (M. Nilsson, S. Olsson) (PP) – 08:11	1–0
	1–1	10:29 – F. Engel (S. Ortolf)
C. Berglund (K. Luukkonen, A. Torgersson) – 13:24	2–1
	2–2	14:49 – C. Wichert (P. Seifert)
Berglund (Luukkonen) – 15:25	3–2
D. Brolin (Olsson, E. Bejmo) – 15:37	4–2
Hoglund (I. Lilja) – 16:58	5–2
	5–3	21:26 – D. Menge (T. Greilinger)
	5–4	24:25 – Menge (Greilinger) (PP)
	5–5	25:02 – V. Aab (A. Wurm)
	5–6	29:22 – Greilinger (Menge)
Berglund (Brolin) – 34:35	6–6
	6–7	41:22 – B. Blank (Wichert)
Broling (Berglund) – 43:38	7–7
Olsson (A. Svensson) – 43:38	8–7
Brolin (ENG) – 47:59	9–7

3 min
Penalties
3 min
40
Shots
33

20 June 2011; 18:00	Czech Republic	9 – 2 (3–1, 1–0, 3–1, 2–0)	Finland	ČEZ Arena, Pardubice; Attendance: 3,500

Game reference

Roman Handl
Goalies
Petri Karhu
Samu Airasvaara
Referees:
(Slovenia) Crt Kralj
(Sweden) Alexander Gleisner

J. Besser (P. Strycek) – 02:58	1–0
P. Tenkrat (V. Kames) – 03:46	2–0
	2–1	07:05 – S. Markkanen (P. Ahosilta, T. Kauppinen) (PP)
L. Broz (T. Demel, K. Rachunek) (PP) – 11:20	3–1
J. Polansky (P. Sebek) – 18:27	4–1
Polansky – 29:26	5–1
Tenkrat (M. Koudelka) – 30:15	6–1
Broz (M. Vozdecky) (PP) – 33:49	7–1
	7–2	35:57 – Markkanen (Kauppinen) (PP)
Vozdecky (Demel) – 42:09	8–2
Broz (Rachunek) – 45:45	9–2

9 min
Penalties
4.5 min
29
Shots
22

21 June 2011; 16:00	Finland	7 – 5 (2–1, 3–1, 0–1, 2–2)	Germany	ČEZ Arena, Pardubice; Attendance: 553

Game reference

Petri Karhu
Goalies
Jochen Vollmer
Referees:
(Slovakia) Lubos Jakubec
(Czech Republic) Tomas Wurtherle

	0–1	00:29 – T. Greilinger (F. Engel)
M. Palotie (K. Lohtander, J. Saarinen) – 01:45	1–1
P. Ahosilta (S. Markkanen, T. Kauppinen) – 05:28	2–1
M- Jokinen (J. Joki-Erkkila) – 12:21	3–1
Lohtander (Kauppinen, Saarinen) – 18:31	4–1
	4–2	20:11 – Greilinger (Engel, D. Menge)
Ahosilta (Kauppinen) – 23:45	5–2
	5–3	35:21 – Engel (Greilinger, H. Holscher)
	5–4	41:37 – Holscher (A. Wurm)
	5–5	43:11 – Wurm (B. Blank, Holscher)
Palotie (Jokinen, Saarinen) – 46:23	6–5
Jokinen (Lohtander, P. Karhu) (ENG) – 47:52	7–5

0 min
Penalties
3 min
35
Shots
27

21 June 2011; 18:00	Czech Republic	6 – 3 (2–1, 0–0, 2–0, 2–2)	Sweden	ČEZ Arena, Pardubice; Attendance: 4,500

Game reference

Roman Handl
Goalies
Sebastian Idoff
Referees:
(United States) Dan Dreger
(Australia) Jeffrey Scott

	0–1	00:57 – S. Olsson (M. Nilsson)
P. Tenkrat (V. Kames) (PP) – 10:31	1–1
T. Demel (M. Vozdecky) – 11:03	2–1
J. Besser (P. Strycek, P. Sebek) – 26:16	3–1
Tenkrat (Kames, J. Mojzis) (PP) – 33:44	4–1
	4–2	41:02 – K. Luukkonen (E. Bejmo)
	4–3	42:20 – H. Hoglund (A. Svensson, Olsson) (PP)
L. Broz (Demel) – 47:12	5–3
Tenkrat (ENG) – 47:48	6–3

24.5 min
Penalties
13.5 min
42
Shots
28

== Playoff round ==
Quarterfinals
B2	Finland	5
A3	Canada	6
A1	United States	16
B4	Germany	1
A2	Slovenia	2
B3	Sweden	6
A4	Czech Republic	9
B1	Slovakia	2

Semifinals
QF1	Canada	2
QF2	United States	4
QF3	Sweden	4
QF4	Czech Republic	8

Finals
SF1	United States	2
SF2	Czech Republic	3
Bronze medal game
SF1	Canada	13
SF2	Sweden	7

=== Quarterfinals ===
All times are local (UTC+2).

23 June 2011; 14:00	Slovenia	2 – 6 (2–0, 0–2, 0–1, 0–3)	Sweden	ČEZ Arena, Pardubice; Attendance: 200

Game reference

Gasper Kroselj
Goalies
Jonas Sparring
Referees:
(Czech Republic) Tomas Wurtherle
(Slovakia) Norbert Druga

A. Kuralt (K. Ograjensek) – 03:22	1–0
M. Kralj (A. Remar) (PP) – 10:42	2–0
	2–1	21:36 – H. Hoglund (M. Nilsson, S. Olsson) (PP)
	2–2	22:12 – K. Luukkonen (A. Torgersson)
	2–3	30:35 – Nilsson
	2–4	41:14 – Luukkonen (P. Bergman, D. Brolin)
	2–5	43:17 – C. Berglund (Torgersson)
	2–6	46:36 – Olsson (ENG)

9 min
Penalties
7.5 min
25
Shots
39

23 June 2011; 16:00	Finland	5 – 6 (1–1, 1–3, 2–1, 1–1)	Canada	ČEZ Arena, Pardubice; Attendance: 1,000

Game reference

Petri Karhu
Goalies
Brett Leggat
Referees:
(Czech Republic) Petr Ulehla
(Germany) Roland Aumueller

P. Ahosilta (S. Markkanen, T. Kauppinen) – 02:28	1–0
	1–1	09:26 – T. Woods (K. Henderson)
	1–2	14:34 – Woods (Henderson, K. French)
	1–3	17:22 – J. Carter
J. Joki-Erkkila (L. Lappalainen, M. Jokinen) – 18:36	2–3
	2–4	21:12 – D. Hammond (A. Ross)
Markkanen (Kauppinen) (PP) – 30:20	3–4
	3–5	31:20 – Carter (Woods)
Lappalainen – 32:56	4–5
	4–6	42:08 – Woods (M. Grassi, Hammond) (PP)
J. Saarinen (Markkanen) (PP2) – 47:45	5–6

3 min
Penalties
9 min
35
Shots
30

23 June 2011; 18:00	Czech Republic	9 – 2 (3–1, 3–0, 1–0, 2–1)	Slovakia	ČEZ Arena, Pardubice; Attendance: 4,200

Game reference

Roman Handl
Goalies
Roman Hrusovsky
Jozef Ondrejka
Referees:
(Austria) Ulrich Erd
(Canada) Carl Friday

L. Broz (P. Tenkrat) – 01:16	1–0
	1–1	02:14 – M. Galik (J. Ruckay, R. Simunek)
P. Sebek (Broz, M. Vozdecky) – 08:50	2–1
J. Polansky (P. Strycek) – 09:10	3–1
M. Koudelka (V. Kames, T. Mojzis) – 17:30	4–1
Broz (Sebek) – 21:37	5–1
L. Vlcek (Strycek) – 23:09	6–1
Sebek (Broz) – 29:10	7–1
Broz (Sebek, T. Demel) (PP) – 38:36	8–1
	8–2	44:53 – M. Holovic (M. Klucar, M. Kristin)
Demel (J. Curik, Broz) – 45:45	9–2

1.5 min
Penalties
4.5 min
34
Shots
19

23 June 2011; 20:00	United States	16 – 1 (3–0, 3–0, 5–1, 5–0)	Germany	ČEZ Arena, Pardubice; Attendance: 200

Game reference

Tommy Tartaglione
Goalies
Thomas Ower
Jochen Vollmer
Referees:
(Finland) Jukka Virta
(Czech Republic) Radim Prchal

J. Doran (N. Sigmund) – 05:27	1–0
K. Kraemer (J. Beilsten) – 06:36	2–0
I. Chavira (J. Cadiz Jr., Tartaglione) – 08:05	3–0
T. Walser (C. Yoder) – 14:21	4–0
S. Gawrys (Yoder) – 17:18	5–0
Cadiz Jr. – 21:10	6–0
	6–1	27:59 – B. Blank (H. Holscher)
Chavira (Cadiz Jr.) – 30:09	7–1
G. Osterkamp (Tartaglione) – 31:27	8–1
Yoder (Sigmund, Beilsten) (PP) – 35:08	9–1
Walser – 35:38	10–1
Kraemer (Sigmund) – 35:53	11–1
Kraemer (Sigmund, Beilsten) – 40:00	12–1
Chavira (Cadiz Jr., A. Miner) – 40:32	13–1
Osterkamp (Cadiz Jr.) – 45:03	14–1
Chavira (Osterkamp, Beilsten) (PP) – 47:07	15–1
Kraemer (Beilsten) – 47:47	16–1

1.5 min
Penalties
4.5 min
54
Shots
15

=== Placement round ===
All times are local (UTC+2).

24 June 2011; 14:00	Slovenia	5 – 3 (1–1, 1–1, 1–1, 2–0)	Germany	ČEZ Arena, Pardubice; Attendance: 150

Game reference

Peter Skrabelj
Gasper Koselj
Goalies
Dennis Berger
Referees:
(Sweden) Alexander Gleisner
(Czech Republic) Tomas Wurtherle

M. Kralj (A. Remar) – 00:47	1–0
	1–1	08:38 – A. Duck (F. Engel, T. Greilinger) (PP)
	1–2	12:37 – D. Rossi (S. Ortolf)
J. Loboda (Kralj) – 18:27	2–2
	2–3	25:38 – B. Blank (H. Holscher)
Kralj (Loboda, D. Slivnik) – 26:39	3–3
Kralj (Berlisk, Loboda) – 43:45	4–3
R. Sabolic (D. Vedlin, D. Zemva) – 47:59	5–3

6 min
Penalties
6 min
26
Shots
30

24 June 2011; 16:00	Finland	5 – 4 (GWS) (0–1, 0–0, 2–0, 2–3) (OT 0–0) (GWS 1–0)	Slovakia	ČEZ Arena, Pardubice; Attendance: 300

Game reference

Samu Airasvaara
Goalies
Roman Hrusovsky
Referees:
(Australia) Jeffrey Scott
(Czech Republic) Radim Prchal

	0–1	08:07 – M. Kristin (F. Novak) (PP)
S. Markkanen (K. Lohtander, Airasvaara) – 25:11	1–1
Markkanen (Lohtander, J. Saarinen) – 27:52	2–1
	2–2	36:29 – Novak (M. Holovic)
Markkanen (Lohtander) (PP) – 37:21	3–2
	3–3	39:31 – M. Priechodsky
	3–4	47:43 – Novak (Holovic, Priechodsky)
Lohtander (Saarinen) – 47:50	4–4
Markkanen – 53:00	5–4

4.5 min
Penalties
14.5 min
43
Shots
27

=== Semifinals ===
All times are local (UTC+2).

24 June 2011; 18:00	Sweden	4 – 8 (2–2, 0–1, 0–2, 2–3)	Czech Republic	ČEZ Arena, Pardubice; Attendance: 3,500

Game reference

Sebastian Idoff
Goalies
Roman Handl
Referees:
(Australia) Jeffrey Scott
(Czech Republic) Radim Prchal

E. Bejmo (D. Brolin, K. Luukkonen) – 00:57	1–0
	1–1	03:35 – M. Vozdecky (K. Rachunek, T. Demel)
	1–2	07:03 – M. Koudelka (K. Rachunek)
S. Olsson (M. Nilsson) – 08:04	2–2
	2–3	16:51 – J. Besser (J. Polansky)
	2–4	30:57 – Polansky (Besser)
	2–5	34:57 – Besser (Polansky)
H. Hoglund (A. Svensson, Nilsson) (PP) – 36:53	3–5
	3–6	42:30 – Vozdecky
Svensson (Olsson) (PP) – 43:47	4–6
	4–7	46:24 – Rachunek
	4–8	47:48 – P. Tenkrat (ENG)

7.5 min
Penalties
6 min
22
Shots
35

24 June 2011; 20:00	Canada	2 – 4 (0–2, 1–1, 1–1, 0–0)	United States	ČEZ Arena, Pardubice; Attendance: 500

Game reference

Brett Leggat
Goalies
Troy Redmann
Referees:
(Slovenia) Crt Kralj
(Slovakia) Norbert Druga

	0–1	02:00 – S. Gawrys (C. Yoder, R. Rodriguez)
	0–2	10:50 – N. Sigmund (T. Walser)
	0–3	14:44 – I. Chavira (G. Osterkamp)
J. Eng (J. Foote, D. Nowakowski) – 17:59	1–3
	1–4	30:33 – Chavira (Gawrys, Osterkamp) (PP)
D. Hammond (SH) – 32:58	2–4

7.5 min
Penalties
4.5 min
28
Shots
33

=== Relegation round ===
Time is local (UTC+2).

25 June 2011; 10:00	Germany	9 – 0 (3–0, 4–0, 1–0, 1–0)	Slovakia	ČEZ Arena, Pardubice; Attendance: 102

Game reference

Dennis Berger
Goalies
Jozef Ondrejka
Referees:
(Australia) Jeffrey Scott
(Sweden) Alexander Gleisner

F. Engel (C. Wichert, A. Wurm) – 03:05	1–0
S. Ortolf (D. Rossi) – 07:11	2–0
Wichert (P. Seifert, Ortolf) – 10:14	3–0
V. Aab (H. Holscher, B. Blank) (PP) – 15:47	4–0
Rossi (Ortolf) – 17:59	5–0
Ortolf (Wichert, Blank) – 22:05	6–0
Engel (Aab) – 23:02	7–0
Aab (Blank, Holscher) – 32:28	8–0
Holscher (Aab, Blank) – 39:21	9–0

3 min
Penalties
3 min
27
Shots
19

=== Bronze medal game ===
Time is local (UTC+2).

25 June 2011; 16:00	Canada	13 – 7 (1–2, 5–0, 5–3, 2–2)	Sweden	ČEZ Arena, Pardubice; Attendance: 2,500

Game reference

Brett Leggat
Goalies
Sebastian Idoff
Jonas Sparring
Referees:
(Czech Republic) Radim Prchal
(Slovenia) Crt Kralj

A. Ross (J. Foote) – 09:05	1–0
	1–1	10:11 – S. Olsson (E. Bejmo)
	1–2	10:51 – Bejmo (Olsson)
T. Woods (Ross, M. Grassi) (PP) – 13:33	2–2
T. Woods (PP) – 14:22	3–2
D. Hammond (Ross) – 16:15	4–2
J. Carter (K. French) – 16:53	5–2
Hammond (Grassi) – 23:33	6–2
	6–3	25:59 – Olsson (H. Hoglund)
Hammond (Grassi) – 26:17	7–3
Grassi (Hammond) – 26:38	8–3
Carter (Grassi) – 27:07	9–3
	9–4	28:53 – S. Thellberg (K. Luukkonen, Bejmo)
Woods (French) – 31:49	10–4
Hammond – 33:57	11–4
	11–5	35:00 – Hoglund (D. Brolin, A. Torgersson)
	11–6	39:25 – M. Nilsson (Olsson, Torgersson) (PP)
Hammond (ENG) – 41:40	12–6
	12–7	42:19 – Bejmo (Luukkonen, A. Myren)
Hammond (K. Henderson) (ENG) – 44:26	13–7

19 min
Penalties
19 min
36
Shots
37

=== Gold medal match ===
Time is local (UTC+2).

25 June 2011; 18:00	Czech Republic	3 – 2 (1–0, 2–1, 0–1, 0–0)	United States	ČEZ Arena, Pardubice; Attendance: 6,000

Game reference

Roman Handl
Goalies
Troy Redmann
Referees:
(Finland) Jukka Virta
(Canada) Carl Friday

M. Vozdecky (T. Demel) – 07:42	1–0
	1–1	15:42 – I. Chavira (S. Gawrys, J. Beilsten) (PP)
J. Besser (J. Polansky) – 19:51	2–1
T. Mojzis (P. Tenkrat, M. Koudelka) – 23:11	3–1
	3–2	35:53 – Chavira (Beilsten)

7.5 min
Penalties
4.5 min
36
Shots
30

2011 IIHF InLine Hockey World Championship winners

Czech Republic
1st title

== Ranking and statistics ==
=== Tournament Awards ===
- Best players selected by the directorate:
  - Best Goalkeeper: Roman Handl (CZE)
  - Best Defenseman: Tomas Demel (CZE)
  - Best Forward: Jose Junior Cadiz (USA)

=== Final standings ===
The final standings of the tournament according to IIHF:

Rk.	Team
1st place, gold medalist(s)	Czech Republic
2nd place, silver medalist(s)	United States
3rd place, bronze medalist(s)	Canada
4.	Sweden
5.	Finland
6.	Slovenia
7.	Germany
8.	Slovakia

=== Scoring leaders ===
List shows the top skaters sorted by points, then goals. If the list exceeds 10 skaters because of a tie in points, all of the tied skaters are shown.

Player	GP	G	A	Pts	+/−	PIM	POS
(Canada) David Hammond	6	11	6	17	+5	6.0	FW
(Finland) Sami Markkanen	5	9	6	15	−5	1.5	DF
(Czech Republic) Ludek Broz	6	9	5	14	+15	6.0	FW
(Sweden) Simon Olsson	6	7	7	14	+1	13.0	FW
(United States) Itan Chavira	5	10	1	11	+5	1.5	FW
(Slovenia) Matic Kralj	5	9	2	11	−3	4.5	FW
(Sweden) Kristian Luukkonen	6	5	6	11	+2	4.5	FW
(Czech Republic) Martin Vozdecky	6	5	6	11	+13	3.0	FW
(United States) Nathan Sigmund	6	4	7	11	+10	1.5	FW
(Canada) Max Grassi	6	3	8	11	+9	4.5	FW

GP = Games played; G = Goals; A = Assists; Pts = Points; +/− = Plus/minus; PIM = Penalties in minutes; POS = Position
Source: IIHF.com

=== Leading goaltenders ===
Only the top five goaltenders, based on save percentage, who have played 40% of their team's minutes are included in this list.

Player	TOI	SA	GA	GAA	Sv%	SO
(Czech Republic) Roman Handl	288:00	142	14	1.75	90.14	0
(United States) Troy Redmann	190:55	103	11	2.07	89.32	0
(Slovenia) Gasper Kroselj	205:11	149	20	3.51	86.58	0
(Slovakia) Roman Hrusovsky	142:01	113	18	4.56	84.07	0
(Canada) Brett Leggat	286:43	183	30	3.77	83.61	0

TOI = Time on ice (minutes:seconds); SA = Shots against; GA = Goals against; GAA = Goals against average; Sv% = Save percentage; SO = Shutouts.
Source: IIHF.com

== See also ==
- 2011 IIHF InLine Hockey World Championship Division I
