= Giona (given name) =

Giona is the Italian form of the name Jonah.

== List of people with the given name ==
- Giona Cividino (born 1974), Italian bobsledder
- Giona A. Nazzaro (born 1965), Italian film critic
- Giona Terzo Ortenzi (born 1996), Italian ice dancer
- Giona Ostinelli (born 1986), Swiss–Italian composer

== See also ==
- Gina (given name)
- Gino (given name)
- Gita (given name)
