= Joseph Jonas (disambiguation) =

Joseph Jonas (1845–1921) was the German-born Lord Mayor of Sheffield.

Joseph or Joe Jonas may also refer to:

- Joe Jonas (born 1989), American singer and actor; member of the Jonas Brothers
- Joe Jonas (rugby union) (born 2000), South African rugby player
