= 2011 IIHF Inline Hockey World Championship Division I =

International sports tournament

Tournament details
- Host country: Czech Republic
- Venue: 1 (in 1 host city)
- Dates: 19–25 June
- Teams: 8

Tournament statistics
- Games played: 22
- Goals scored: 212 (9.64 per game)
- Attendance: 1,187 (54 per game)

The 2011 IIHF InLine Hockey World Championship Division I was the 16th Division I tournament of the IIHF InLine Hockey World Championship. It took place between 19 and 25 June in the Czech Republic. The games were played in the ČEZ Aréna in Ostrava.

== Venue ==
Ostrava
ČEZ Aréna
Capacity: 9,568
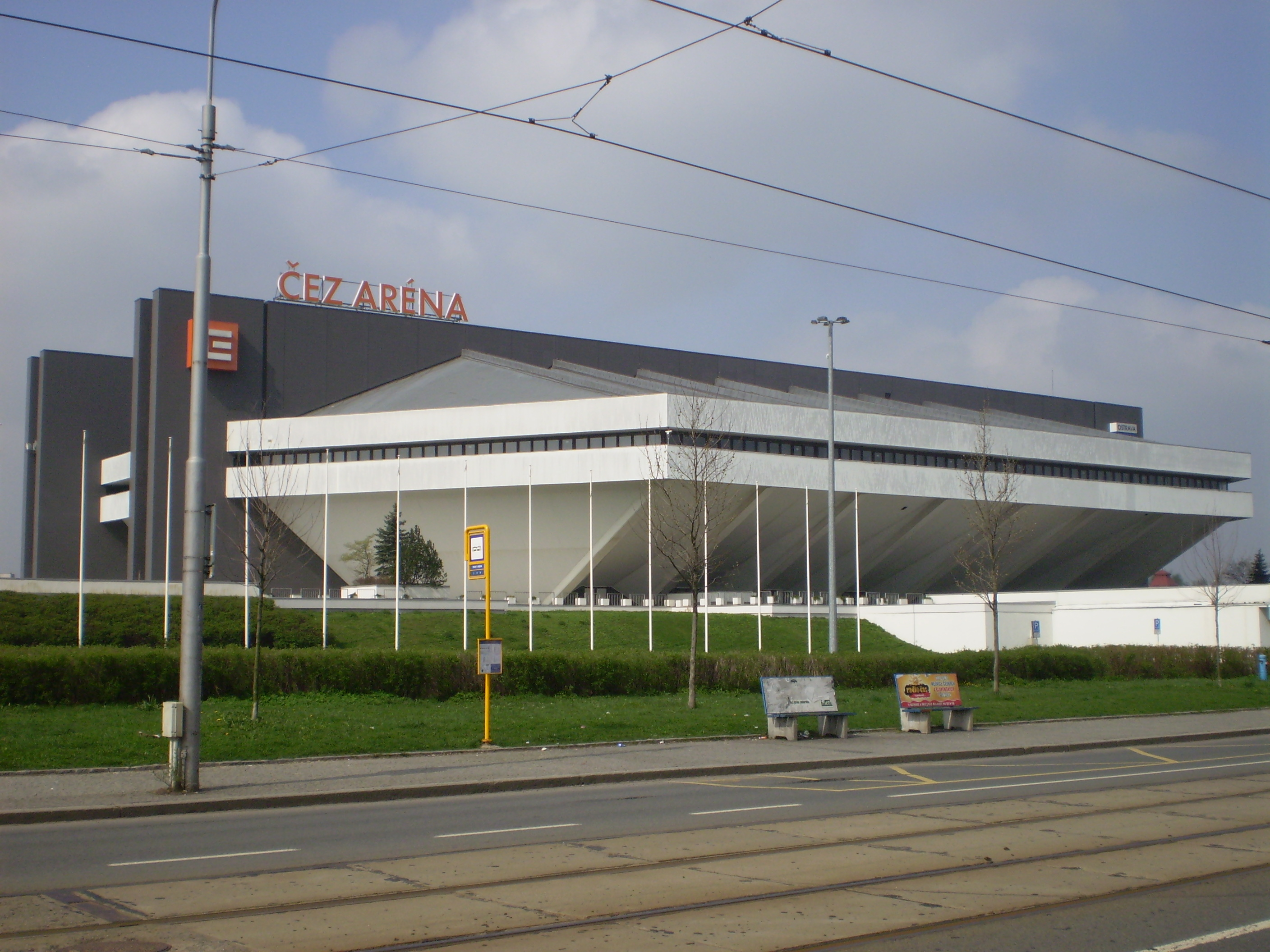

== Qualification ==
Played in Namibia

13 August 2010	Namibia	2 - 3 (0–1, 0–2, 1–0, 1–0)	South Africa

14 August 2010	Namibia	3 - 4 (1–0, 1–0, 0–3, 1–1)	South Africa

== Nations ==
The following eight nations qualified for the Division I tournament.

- Argentina
- Austria
- Australia
- Croatia
- Great Britain
- Hungary
- New Zealand
- South Africa

== Seeding and groups ==
The seeding in the preliminary round was based on the final standings at the 2010 IIHF InLine Hockey World Championship and 2010 IIHF InLine Hockey World Championship Division I. The teams were grouped accordingly by seeding at the previous year's tournament (in parentheses is the corresponding seeding):

Group A

- Austria (9)
- Australia (12)
- Great Britain (13)
- South Africa (16)

Group B

- Croatia (10)
- Hungary (11)
- Argentina (14)
- New Zealand (15)

== Preliminary round ==
Eight participating teams were placed in the following two groups. After playing a round-robin, every team advanced to the Playoff round.

=== Group A ===
Team	Pld	W	OTW	OTL	L	GF	GA	GD	Pts
Great Britain	3	3	0	0	0	20	4	+16	9
Austria	3	2	0	0	1	17	11	+6	6
Australia	3	1	0	0	2	15	13	+2	3
South Africa	3	0	0	0	3	4	28	−24	0

All times are local (UTC+2).

19 June 2011; 13:00	Australia	1 – 6 (0–1, 0–2, 0–1, 1–2)	Great Britain	ČEZ Aréna, Ostrava; Attendance: 30

Game reference
			Referees: (Czech Republic) Tomas Wurtherle (Finland) Jukka Virta
1.5 min	Penalties	9 min	Referees: (Czech Republic) Tomas Wurtherle (Finland) Jukka Virta
40	Shots	22	Referees: (Czech Republic) Tomas Wurtherle (Finland) Jukka Virta

19 June 2011; 17:00	South Africa	1 – 10 (0–3, 0–1, 0–4, 1–2)	Austria	ČEZ Aréna, Ostrava; Attendance: 50

Game reference
			Referees: (Slovakia) Norbert Druga (Czech Republic) Petr Ulehla
9 min	Penalties	7.5 min	Referees: (Slovakia) Norbert Druga (Czech Republic) Petr Ulehla
15	Shots	41	Referees: (Slovakia) Norbert Druga (Czech Republic) Petr Ulehla

20 June 2011; 13:00	Australia	11 – 3 (1–0, 3–0, 4–1, 3–2)	South Africa	ČEZ Aréna, Ostrava; Attendance: 40

Game reference
			Referees: (United States) Dan Dreger (Germany) Peter Reiter
4.5 min	Penalties	3 min	Referees: (United States) Dan Dreger (Germany) Peter Reiter
26	Shots	20	Referees: (United States) Dan Dreger (Germany) Peter Reiter

20 June 2011; 17:00	Austria	3 – 7 (0–1, 1–3, 1–0, 1–3)	Great Britain	ČEZ Aréna, Ostrava; Attendance: 43

Game reference
			Referees: (Australia) Jeffrey Scott (Hungary) Balazs Kovacs
9 min	Penalties	10.5 min	Referees: (Australia) Jeffrey Scott (Hungary) Balazs Kovacs
27	Shots	22	Referees: (Australia) Jeffrey Scott (Hungary) Balazs Kovacs

21 June 2011; 13:00	Great Britain	7 – 0 (1–0, 2–0, 2–0, 2–0)	South Africa	ČEZ Aréna, Ostrava

Game reference
			Referees: (Austria) Ulrich Erd (Sweden) Alexander Gleisner
4.5 min	Penalties	1.5 min	Referees: (Austria) Ulrich Erd (Sweden) Alexander Gleisner
42	Shots	16	Referees: (Austria) Ulrich Erd (Sweden) Alexander Gleisner

21 June 2011; 17:00	Austria	4 – 3 (2–0, 0–1, 2–2, 0–0)	Australia	ČEZ Aréna, Ostrava

Game reference
			Referees: (Canada) Carl Friday (Germany) Roland Aumueller
4.5 min	Penalties	4.5 min	Referees: (Canada) Carl Friday (Germany) Roland Aumueller
29	Shots	25	Referees: (Canada) Carl Friday (Germany) Roland Aumueller

=== Group B ===
Team	Pld	W	OTW	OTL	L	GF	GA	GD	Pts
Hungary	3	3	0	0	0	14	8	+6	9
Croatia	3	2	0	0	1	16	7	+9	6
New Zealand	3	1	0	0	2	11	17	−6	3
Argentina	3	0	0	0	3	8	17	−9	0

All times are local (UTC+2).

19 June 2011; 15:00	Hungary	4 – 2 (1–0, 1–0, 2–0, 0–2)	Argentina	ČEZ Aréna, Ostrava; Attendance: 100

Game reference
			Referees: (Sweden) Alexander Gleisner (Germany) Roland Aumueller
6 min	Penalties	3 min	Referees: (Sweden) Alexander Gleisner (Germany) Roland Aumueller
35	Shots	25	Referees: (Sweden) Alexander Gleisner (Germany) Roland Aumueller

19 June 2011; 19:00	New Zealand	1 – 7 (0–3, 0–1, 0–2, 1–1)	Croatia	ČEZ Aréna, Ostrava; Attendance: 200

Game reference
			Referees: (Germany) Peter Reiter (Hungary) Balazs Kovacs
6 min	Penalties	4.5 min	Referees: (Germany) Peter Reiter (Hungary) Balazs Kovacs
23	Shots	27	Referees: (Germany) Peter Reiter (Hungary) Balazs Kovacs

20 June 2011; 15:00	Hungary	5 – 4 (0–1, 0–0, 2–1, 3–2)	New Zealand	ČEZ Aréna, Ostrava; Attendance: 60

Game reference
			Referees: (Slovakia) Lubos Jakubec (Czech Republic) Tomas Wurtherle
6 min	Penalties	9 min	Referees: (Slovakia) Lubos Jakubec (Czech Republic) Tomas Wurtherle
36	Shots	26	Referees: (Slovakia) Lubos Jakubec (Czech Republic) Tomas Wurtherle

20 June 2011; 19:00	Croatia	7 – 1 (2–0, 3–0, 2–1, 0–0)	Argentina	ČEZ Aréna, Ostrava; Attendance: 31

Game reference
			Referees: (Canada) Carl Friday (Czech Republic) Radim Prchal
7.5 min	Penalties	6 min	Referees: (Canada) Carl Friday (Czech Republic) Radim Prchal
40	Shots	18	Referees: (Canada) Carl Friday (Czech Republic) Radim Prchal

21 June 2011; 15:00	Argentina	5 – 6 (1–1, 1–2, 1–2, 2–1)	New Zealand	ČEZ Aréna, Ostrava

Game reference
			Referees: (Slovakia) Norbert Druga (Finland) Jukka Virta
3 min	Penalties	4.5 min	Referees: (Slovakia) Norbert Druga (Finland) Jukka Virta
21	Shots	25	Referees: (Slovakia) Norbert Druga (Finland) Jukka Virta

21 June 2011; 19:00	Croatia	2 – 5 (0–1, 0–2, 2–0, 0–2)	Hungary	ČEZ Aréna, Ostrava; Attendance: 35

Game reference
			Referees: (Slovenia) Crt Kralj (Finland) Tony Kuloaro
7.5 min	Penalties	7.5 min	Referees: (Slovenia) Crt Kralj (Finland) Tony Kuloaro
43	Shots	23	Referees: (Slovenia) Crt Kralj (Finland) Tony Kuloaro

== Playoff round ==
Quarterfinals
A1	Great Britain	12
B4	Argentina	0
B2	Croatia	3
A3	Australia	7
B1	Hungary	4
A4	South Africa	2
A2	Austria	10
B3	New Zealand	9

Semifinals
QF1	Great Britain	11
QF2	Australia	3
QF3	Hungary	5
QF4	Austria	4

Finals
SF1	Great Britain	3
SF2	Hungary	2
Bronze medal game
SF1	Australia	4
SF2	Austria	8

=== Quarterfinals ===
All times are local (UTC+2).

23 June 2011; 13:00	Austria	10 – 9 (3–0, 3–3, 1–1, 2–5, 1–0)	New Zealand	ČEZ Aréna, Ostrava; Attendance: 63

Game reference
			Referees: (Germany) Peter Reiter (Slovakia) Lubos Jakubec
3 min	Penalties	3 min	Referees: (Germany) Peter Reiter (Slovakia) Lubos Jakubec
29	Shots	25	Referees: (Germany) Peter Reiter (Slovakia) Lubos Jakubec

23 June 2011; 15:00	Croatia	3 – 7 (2–3, 1–3, 0–0, 0–1)	Australia	ČEZ Aréna, Ostrava; Attendance: 74

Game reference
			Referees: (Slovenia) Crt Kralj (United States) Dan Dreger
7.5 min	Penalties	6 min	Referees: (Slovenia) Crt Kralj (United States) Dan Dreger
28	Shots	38	Referees: (Slovenia) Crt Kralj (United States) Dan Dreger

23 June 2011; 17:00	Great Britain	12 – 0 (3–0, 2–0, 4–0, 3–0)	Argentina	ČEZ Aréna, Ostrava; Attendance: 20

Game reference
			Referees: (Hungary) Balazs Kovacs (Australia) Jeffrey Scott
6 min	Penalties	13.5 min	Referees: (Hungary) Balazs Kovacs (Australia) Jeffrey Scott
36	Shots	14	Referees: (Hungary) Balazs Kovacs (Australia) Jeffrey Scott

23 June 2011; 19:00	Hungary	4 – 2 (0–1, 0–0, 1–0, 3–1)	South Africa	ČEZ Aréna, Ostrava; Attendance: 89

Game reference
			Referees: (Sweden) Alexander Gleisner (Finland) Tony Kuloaro
4.5 min	Penalties	3 min	Referees: (Sweden) Alexander Gleisner (Finland) Tony Kuloaro
39	Shots	38	Referees: (Sweden) Alexander Gleisner (Finland) Tony Kuloaro

=== Placement round ===
All times are local (UTC+2).

24 June 2011; 13:00	New Zealand	5 – 6 (1–0, 2–1, 1–3, 1–1, 0–1)	Argentina	ČEZ Arena, Pardubice; Attendance: 23

Game reference
			Referees: (Finland) Jukka Virta (Czech Republic) Petr Ulehla
3 min	Penalties	3 min	Referees: (Finland) Jukka Virta (Czech Republic) Petr Ulehla
30	Shots	29	Referees: (Finland) Jukka Virta (Czech Republic) Petr Ulehla

24 June 2011; 15:00	Croatia	6 – 3 (3–1, 2–0, 0–0, 1–2)	South Africa	ČEZ Arena, Pardubice; Attendance: 35

Game reference
			Referees: (Germany) Peter Reiter (Slovakia) Lubos Jakubec
4.5 min	Penalties	3 min	Referees: (Germany) Peter Reiter (Slovakia) Lubos Jakubec
30	Shots	18	Referees: (Germany) Peter Reiter (Slovakia) Lubos Jakubec

=== Semifinals ===
All times are local (UTC+2).

24 June 2011; 17:00	Hungary	5 – 4 (0–0, 1–3, 1–1, 3–0)	Austria	ČEZ Aréna, Ostrava; Attendance: 38

Game reference
			Referees: (Canada) Carl Friday (Germany) Roland Aumueller
0 min	Penalties	1.5 min	Referees: (Canada) Carl Friday (Germany) Roland Aumueller
25	Shots	35	Referees: (Canada) Carl Friday (Germany) Roland Aumueller

24 June 2011; 19:00	Great Britain	11 – 3 (2–1, 3–1, 4–1, 2–0)	Australia	ČEZ Aréna, Ostrava; Attendance: 55

Game reference
			Referees: (Hungary) Balazs Kovacs (Austria) Ulrich Erd
4.5 min	Penalties	6 min	Referees: (Hungary) Balazs Kovacs (Austria) Ulrich Erd
38	Shots	22	Referees: (Hungary) Balazs Kovacs (Austria) Ulrich Erd

=== Third place game ===
Time is local (UTC+2).

25 June 2011; 12:00	Australia	4 – 8 (2–2, 2–4, 0–2, 0–0)	Austria	ČEZ Aréna, Ostrava; Attendance: 36

Game reference
			Referees: (Germany) Roland Aumueller (Finland) Tony Kuloaro
9 min	Penalties	4.5 min	Referees: (Germany) Roland Aumueller (Finland) Tony Kuloaro
42	Shots	35	Referees: (Germany) Roland Aumueller (Finland) Tony Kuloaro

=== Final ===
Time is local (UTC+2).

25 June 2011; 12:30	Great Britain	3 – 2 (2–0, 1–2, 0–0, 0–0)	Hungary	ČEZ Arena, Pardubice; Attendance: 200

Game reference
			Referees: (United States) Dan Dreger (Austria) Ulrich Erd
6 min	Penalties	6 min	Referees: (United States) Dan Dreger (Austria) Ulrich Erd
27	Shots	23	Referees: (United States) Dan Dreger (Austria) Ulrich Erd

== See also ==
- 2011 IIHF InLine Hockey World Championship
