= Elsa Pelgander =

Swedish footballer (born 2006)

Personal information
- Date of birth: 2 August 2006 (age 20)
- Position: Forward

Team information
- Current team: Djurgården (on loan from Juventus)
- Number: 8

Senior career*
Years	Team	Apps	(Gls)
2021	Örebro SK FK	10	(0)
2022–2023	KIF Örebro DFF	27	(0)
2023–2025	Juventus	6	(0)
2025–	Djurgården	5	(0)

International career^{‡}
2021–2023	Sweden U17	20	(3)
2023–	Sweden U19	20	(0)
2025–	Sweden U23	2	(0)
- * Club domestic league appearances and goals ‡ National team caps and goals as of 3 November 2025

Elsa Pelgander (born 2 August 2006) is a Swedish footballer who plays as a midfielder for Damallsvenskan club Djurgårdens IF.

== Career ==
On 17 January 2025, she went to Djurgården on loan for the 2025 season.

== Personal life ==
Elsa Pelgander is the daughter of former football player Jonas Pelgander and has a sister, Emilia, who is also a professional player.
