= North Macedonia men's national inline hockey team =

Macedonia
- Association: Macedonian Ice Hockey Federation
- Team colors
- IIHF code: MKD

First international
- North Macedonia 2–20 Turkey (Sofia, Bulgaria; 2 September 2011)

Biggest win
- North Macedonia 11-5 Bulgaria (Steindorf, Austria; 22 June 2016)

Biggest defeat
- North Macedonia 1–35 Latvia (Passau, Germany; 9 August 2013)

IIHF European Inline Hockey Qualification
- Appearances: 3 (first in 2011)
- Best result: 3rd (2011, 2013)

International record (W–L–T)
- 1–7–0

The Macedonia men's national inline hockey team is the national ice hockey team of the Republic of Macedonia. They are controlled by the Macedonian Ice Hockey Federation, an associate member of the International Ice Hockey Federation. The team currently competes in the IIHF European Inline Hockey Qualification tournament.

== History ==
The Macedonia men's national inline hockey team played its first game in September 2011 against Turkey in the 2011-2012 IIHF European InLine Hockey Qualification Tournament being held in Sofia, Bulgaria. Macedonia lost the game 2–20 and went on to lose their other game against Bulgaria, finishing last in the tournament and failing to qualify for the 2012 IIHF InLine Hockey World Championship Division I. The following year Macedonia again finished last at the European InLine Hockey Qualification Tournament, losing their games against Bulgaria, Latvia and Turkey. In 2013 Macedonia competed in their third IIHF European InLine Hockey Qualification in order to attempt qualification for the 2014 IIHF Inline Hockey World Championship Division I tournament. Macedonia lost both of their games against Ireland and Latvia, finishing last and failing to qualify. Their game against Latvia was their largest ever loss in international competition, losing 35–1.

On June 22, 2016, during European qualification for the 2016 Inline Hockey World Championships, Macedonia defeated Bulgaria by a score of 11–5, earning their first ever international win. They finished 2nd in their group, defeating Serbia 6-5 and falling 11–2 to Austria, and finished fourth in overall qualifiers, losing the third place game 10–5 to Israel.

== International competitions ==
- 2011-2012 IIHF European InLine Hockey Qualification. Finish: 3rd
- 2012-2013 IIHF European InLine Hockey Qualification. Finish: 4th
- 2013-2014 IIHF European Inline Hockey Qualification. Finish: 3rd
- 2015-2016 IIHF European Inline Hockey Qualification.
