= Jonas Pelgander =

Swedish footballer

Personal information
- Full name: Leif Jonas Pelgander
- Date of birth: 19 March 1975 (age 51)
- Place of birth: Örebro, Sweden
- Height: 1.77 m (5 ft 10 in)
- Position: Midfielder

Senior career*
Years	Team	Apps	(Gls)
1995–2002	Örebro SK	151	(0)
2003	BK Häcken		
2004	Falkenbergs FF		
2005	BK Forward		
2006	Panetolikos		
- * Club domestic league appearances and goals

Leif Jonas Pelgander (born 19 March 1975) is a Swedish former footballer who played as a defensive midfielder for Örebro SK, BK Häcken, Falkenbergs FF, BK Forward and Panetolikos.

== Personal life ==
Jonas Pelgander has two daughters who are professional footballers: Emilia Pelgander and Elsa Pelgander.
