= Jonas Balan =

Haitian artist (born 1956)

Jonas Balan (born 1956) is a Haitian metal artist and the head of family business in Croix-des-Bouquets, Haiti. He works alongside his four siblings to create and sell their art. Jonas Balan’s work includes metal images such as mermaids, children playing, and spiritual figures. He has also recently made geckos and painted sculptures. When it comes to colors he works with reds, yellows, oranges and aquatic blues, greens, and purples.

== Biography and family ==
Jonas Balan has three brothers (Julio, Joel, and Romel) and one sister (Mirtha) who were born in the village of Noailles. The brothers continue to work together to create art from metal drum pieces. They depict Vodou spirits in their work, particularly Agwe, master of the sea (represented by a boat), and Marasa (twins associated with children and procreation).

Haitian metal sculpture goes back to the late 1940s. A blacksmith named Georges Liautaud started making decorative metal crosses for a local cemetery and then metal sculptures depicting the Vodou spirits. Liautaud started off with iron and then expanded to using discarded petrochemical steel drums, which Haiti had a large supply of. Liautaud took on apprentices that included John Sylyvestre. Sylyvestre then trained the Balan family. Sylyvestre and the Balan family shared a lakou, or compound. Jonas Balan’s sister, Mirtha, is also a metal sculptor. She is a woman who is in a male-dominated craft. She learned alongside her brothers and now owns her own business.

== The process ==
Artists, such as Jonas, use metal drums to create sculptures. To prepare the drum, the artist starts by removing the ends (which can be used from smaller sculptures). A vertical slit is cut along the length of the cylinder using a hammer and a chisel. The artist then stuffs the drum with straw and paper, which is set on fire to burn off any paint or chemical residue. After the drum cools, it is flattened by climbing on top of the drum and use all his weight and strength to pull it apart. The whole sheet of metal would then be hammered to make the metal softer and easier to work with. Jonas would then draw on his designs using chalk and be cut out.

== Principal expositions ==
- Butinage, 1985, Sculpture- 35 3/8in X 33 1/2in
- Désespoir d'une mère, 1985, Sculpture- 35 3/8in X 33 1/2in
- Paroles D'Amour, 1985
- Confession, 1987

== Other references ==
- "Haitian Art:Metal Decoupe, Metal Sculptures." HAITIAN ART mermaid. Accessed March 8, 2018. http://www.haitian-art-co.com/artists/balan.html
- "Haiti's Vodou Blacksmiths." Haiti Support Group. February 4, 2017. Accessed March 8, 2018. https://haitisupportgroup.org/haitis-vodou-blacksmiths/
