= Jonas Dünzel =

German politician (born 1994)

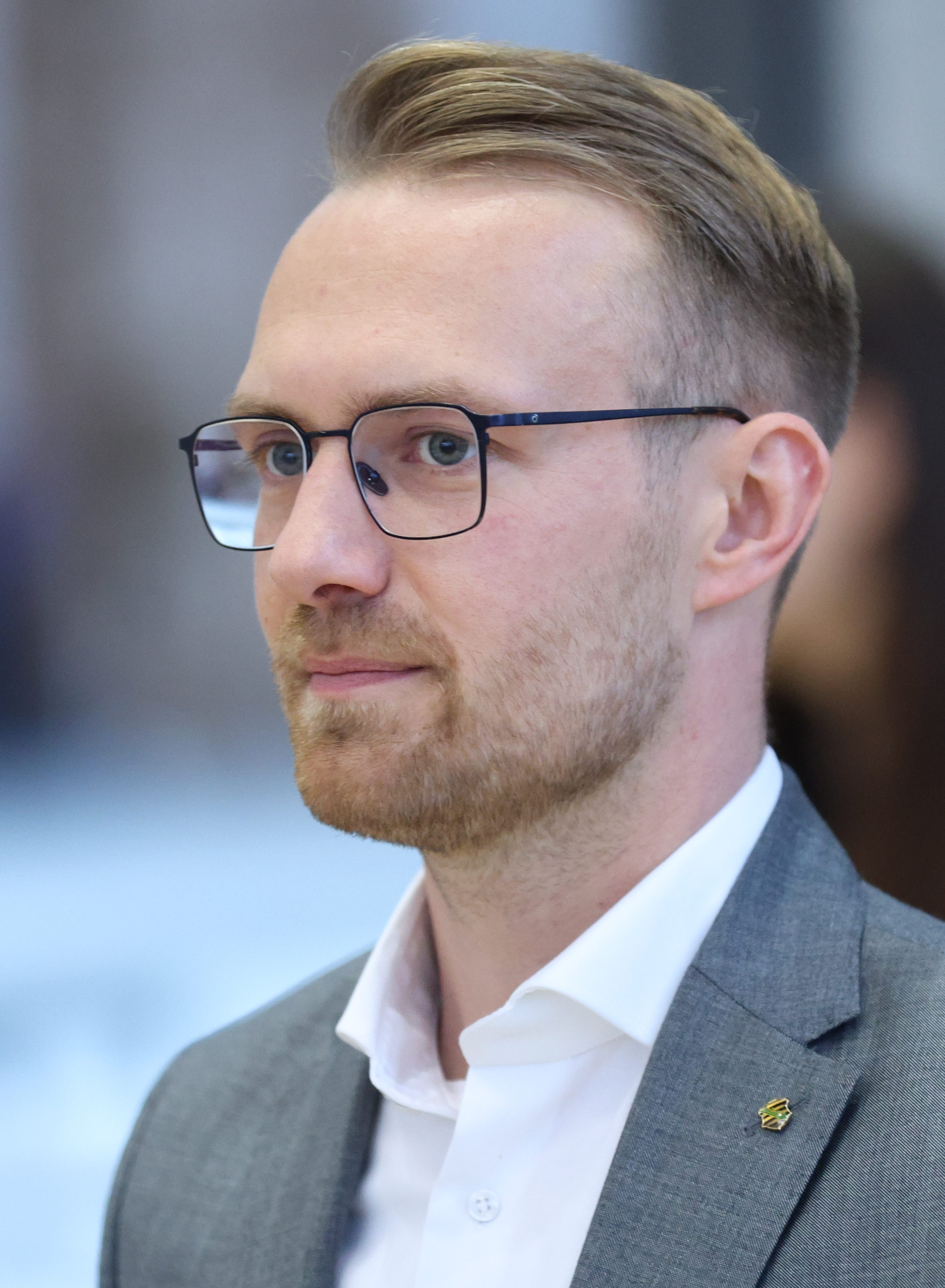
- Dünzel in 2024

Member of the Landtag of Saxony
- Incumbent
- Assumed office 1 October 2024
- Preceded by: Gerald Otto
- Constituency: Zwickau 3

Personal details
- Born: 24 January 1994 (age 32) Magdeburg
- Party: Alternative for Germany (since 2016)

Jonas Dünzel (born 24 January 1994 in Magdeburg) is a German politician serving as a member of the Landtag of Saxony since 2024. He has served as chairman of the Alternative for Germany in Zwickau since 2023.
