= Jonas B. Phillips =

American attorney(1805-1867)

Jonas Benjamin Phillips (October 28, 1805 – May 15, 1867) was an American dramatist, lyricist, poet, and attorney who served as the first assistant district attorney for New York County from 1843 to 1851.

== Early life ==
Phillips was born in Philadelphia in 1805 to a large, distinguished Jewish American family. His paternal grandfather was Jonas Phillips, a veteran of the American Revolutionary War and merchant in New York City and Philadelphia. Benjamin Mendez Seixas was his maternal grandfather, who also fought in the American Revolution, was a prominent merchant in Newport, Philadelphia, and New York City, and was one of the founders of the New York Stock Exchange. Jonas B. Phillips studied law and passed the bar in Philadelphia in 1826.

== Drama and Music Career ==
Phillips moved to New York City in 1828 and initially turned his efforts to creative pursuits rather than focusing on law. He wrote over 70 plays, popular with working-class audiences. His most well-received plays were "The Evil Eye," produced in 1831, and "Camillus," in 1833. Phillips also wrote poetry and lyrics for popular music.

== Legal career ==
Phillips held other positions while he pursued writing. In 1831, he worked as a US Custom House clerk in New York City. He was active in the Democratic-Republican Party in the 1830s and later the Democratic Party. In 1842, Phillips returned to law as an attorney. He was appointed Commissioner of Deeds of New York County in 1843. Also in 1843, he became the first Assistant District Attorney of New York County, a position he held for eight consecutive years. After that, he pursued private practice in criminal law.

== Personal life ==
Phillips never married but had an adopted son. He died in 1867 after suffering for many years from kidney disease, known as “Bright's disease” at the time.
