= Jonas Söderlund =

Swedish organizational theorist (born 1971)

Jonas Söderlund (born June 1, 1971) is a Swedish organizational theorist and Professor in the Department of Leadership and Organizational Behavior at the BI Norwegian Business School, and author. He is known for his work in the fields of human resource management, project management.

== Biography ==
=== Youth, education and early academic career ===
Söderlund was born in Stockholm, Sweden in 1971, son of Söderlund Claes R. and Yvonne Elisabeth Söderlund. In 1995, he obtained his MSc in Business Administration and Economics from the Linköping University in Sweden.

After his graduation Söderlund started teaching and continued his studies at the Linköping University, In 1998 he obtained his Licentiate of Business Administration, and in 2000 his PhD in its International Graduate School of Management and Industrial Engineering (IMIE). His thesis was entitled "Time-limited and complex interaction – studies of industrial projects". In 1998, he had attended the Program in General Management at the Harvard Business School as visiting doctoral student.

=== Further academic career and honours ===
In 2000, Söderlund started as Assistant Professor at the School of Management at the Linköping University, where he was promoted to Associate Professor of Business Administration in 2003. From 2003 to 2007 he also served as Director of the Linköping Project Center at the Linköping University. In 2007, he was appointed Professor in Project Management at the BI Norwegian Business School.

In 2009, Söderlund was awarded the HR Research Award for Best Research on HRM 2009 by the Uppsala University and the Institute for Personnel & Corporate Development (IPF). In 2011, he and Karin Bredin obtained the International Project Management Association (IPMA) Research Award 2011 for "outstanding research on HRM in project-based organizations".

== Selected publications ==
- Lars Lindkvist, Jonas Söderlund & Fredrik Tell Managing product development projects: on the significance of fountains and deadlines,1998.
- Jonas Söderlund. Time-limited and Complex Interaction: Studies of Industrial Projects. Ekonomiska institutionen, Univ. [distributör], 2000.
- Jonas Söderlund. Developing project competence: empirical regularities in competitive project operations, 2005.
- Jonas Söderlund. HRM in project-intensive firms: changes and challenges, 2006.
- Karin Bredin & Jonas Söderlund. Human resource management in project-based organizations : the HR quadriad framework, 2011.
- Jonas Söderlund. Project Management and Organization Theory: IRNOP Meets PMJ. 2014.
- Peter Morris, Jeff Pinto & Jonas Söderlund (Eds.) Oxford Handbook of Project Management, Oxford: Oxford University Press, 2011.

Articles, a selection

- Jonas Söderlund. "Building theories of project management: past research, questions for the future". International journal of project management 22.3 (2004): 183-191.
- Söderlund, Jonas. "On the broadening scope of the research on projects: a review and a model for analysis". International Journal of Project Management 22.8 (2004): 655-667.
- Söderlund, Jonas. "Pluralism in project management: navigating the crossroads of specialization and fragmentation". International Journal of Management Reviews 13.2 (2011): 153-176.
