= Jonasz =

Jonasz is a Polish-language given name and surname, a variant of Jonas.

- Jonasz Kofta, Polish songwriter and poet
- Jonasz Szlichtyng, Polish nobleman and theologian
- Michel Jonasz, French composer-songwriter

== See also ==
- 27949 Jonasz, minor planet
