= Jonas Pangonis =

Lithuanian politician (born 1950)

Jonas Pangonis (born 26 November 1950) is a Lithuanian politician. In 1990 he was among those who signed the Act of the Re-Establishment of the State of Lithuania.
