= Jonas March Tebbetts =

American lawyer and politician (1820–1913)

Jonas March Tebbetts (January 5, 1820 – January 16, 1913) was an American salesman, reporter, lawyer, prosecutor, judge, abolitionist, unionist, politician, and judge in the United States.

== Early life, education, and career ==
He was born in Rochester, New Hampshire. He studied at Phillips Exeter Academy, and in 1838, he enrolled at Western University (later the University of Pittsburgh) in Pittsburgh, Pennsylvania, but "his knowledge in various subjects resulted in his becoming an instructor of English, ancient history, and Greek and Latin languages".

== Legal and political career ==
By 1843, Tebbetts had established himself in the legal community of Crawford County, Arkansas, well enough to be named secretary of a committee of the county bar association convened to draft a statement on the murder of another lawyer in the county, and of a committee of the county Democratic Party to nominate representatives for the state legislature. In August 1850, Tebbetts was himself elected to the Arkansas House of Representatives, serving from November 1850 to January 1851, and "earning a reputation as a pro-Union, antislavery Democrat".

During the American Civil War, Tebbetts was pro-Union, which led to threats on his life, causing him and his family to flee from Arkansas, living thereafter for periods in Missouri and Kentucky.

== Personal life and death ==
Tebbetts married Matilda Winlock, a student at Fayetteville Female Seminary, in 1847. They lived in Fayetteville, Arkansas where they built Headquarters House in 1853 and 1854. They had several children. He became a follower of Alexander Campbell's disciples of Christ. Headquarters House became a Confederate headquarters and then a Union headquarters. Also now known as the Tebbetts House, it later became home to the Washington County Historical Society.

Tebbetts became a widower in 1892, while his family was living in Kentucky, and moved to the Pittsburgh, Pennsylvania, home of his daughter, Lily, where he died at the age of 83. A collection of his papers are part of the Arkansas Digital Archives.
