= Jonas Jensen =

Danish footballer (born 1985)

Personal information
- Full name: Jonas Jensen
- Date of birth: 25 October 1985 (age 41)
- Place of birth: Denmark
- Position: Goalkeeper

Senior career*
Years	Team	Apps	(Gls)
2004–2008	Esbjerg fB	0	(0)
2011–2013	FC Fyn	0	(0)
2013	Skive IK	0	(0)
2013–2018	Esbjerg fB	8	(0)
- * Club domestic league appearances and goals as of 17 January 2019

Jonas Jensen (born 25 October 1985) is a Danish footballer who lastly played for Danish Superliga club Esbjerg fB.
