= Jonas Samuelsson =

Swedish handball player (born 1991)

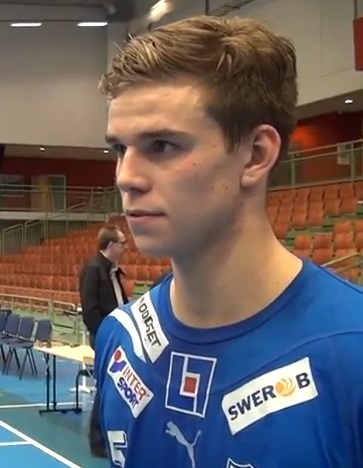
- Samuelsson in 2012

Personal information
- Full name: Sven Jonas Samuelsson
- Nationality: Swedish
- Born: 10 April 1991 (age 35) Skövde, Sweden
- Height: 1.92 m (6 ft 4 in)

Sport
- Sport: Handball
- Position: Right Wing
- Current club: IFK Skövde
- Number: 10

Senior clubs
- Years: Team
- 2010-2015: IFK Skövde
- 2015–2017: SønderjyskE Håndbold
- 2017–2018: HC Midtjylland
- 2018–2020: Skanderborg Håndbold
- 2020–2022: Aalborg Håndbold
- 2022–: IFK Skövde
National team
Years	Team	Apps	(Gls)
2019–	Sweden	5	(8)

Jonas Samuelsson (born 10 April 1991) is a Swedish handball player for IFK Skövde and the Swedish national team.

He made his international debut on the Swedish national team in April 2019 at the age of 28.

== Career ==
Jonas Samuelsson comes from the youth ranks of IFK Skövde where he debuted for the senior team at the age of 17. He broke through permanently on the first team in the 2010-11 season. In 2015 he joined Danish team SønderjyskE Håndbold.

After two seasons he joined league rivals HC Midtjylland. When the club hit economic trouble in the winter of 2017, he was released of his contract. He then joined Skanderborg Håndbold on a two year deal.

In 2020 he joined Aalborg Håndbold. In his first season he won the Danish championship and Danish cup double in 2021 as well as a silver medal in the 2020-21 EHF Champions League and a bronze medal in the IHF Super Globe.

In 2022 he returned to his boyhood club IFK Skövde. In the 2023-24 season he was named in the Swedish league all-star team.
