= Jonas Sparring =

Swedish ice hockey player

- Born: November 6, 1988 (age 37) Partille, Sweden
- Height: 6 ft 2 in (188 cm)
- Weight: 205 lb (93 kg; 14 st 9 lb)
- Position: Goaltender
- Catches: Right
- Elitserien team: Färjestads BK
- Playing career: 2010–present

Jonas Sparring (born November 6, 1988) is a Swedish professional ice hockey goaltender. He played with Färjestads BK in the Elitserien during the 2010–11 Elitserien season.

He was playing for Mjölby later in the year, where he led the league in goalkeeping early in the season.

Sparring competed at the 2011 IIHF InLine Hockey World Championship.
