= Jonas Bauža =

Soviet/Lithuanian footballer

Personal information
- Date of birth: 14 February 1942
- Place of birth: Tauragė, Generalbezirk Litauen
- Date of death: 5 October 2001 (aged 59)
- Place of death: Moscow, Russia
- Height: 1.86 m (6 ft 1 in)
- Position: Goalkeeper

Youth career
- Žalgiris Šiauliai
- DFS Vilnius

Senior career*
Years	Team	Apps	(Gls)
1959–1961	Spartakas Vilnius	72	(0)
1962–1968	CSKA Moscow	149	(0)
1969	Dynamo Moscow	3	(0)
1970–1971	Spartak Moscow	21	(0)
1972	Chornomorets Odesa	5	(0)
- * Club domestic league appearances and goals

Jonas Bauža (14 February 1942 – 5 October 2001) was a Soviet/Lithuanian footballer who played as a goalkeeper with Spartakas Vilnius, CSKA Moscow (where he won the Soviet Cup), Dynamo Moscow and Spartak Moscow.
