= Jonas Paulavičius =

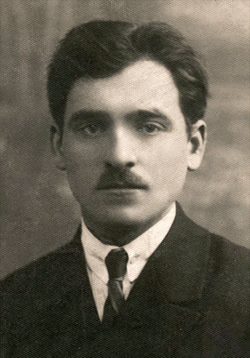
- Born: 1898; Lithuania
- Died: 1952 (aged 53–54); Kaunas, Lithuania
- Title: Righteous Among The Nations
- Partner: Antonina Paulavicius
- Children: Katusis, Donute

Jonas Paulavičius (1898–1952) was a Lithuanian carpenter who worked for the Lithuanian railway company. Most of his life he lived in the suburbs of Kaunas, near the bank of the Neman river. During World War II, Paulavičius saved sixteen people by hiding them in his house. Jonas was murdered in 1952 because of his rescues during World War II. In 1983 Paulavičius was recognized, together with his wife Antonia and their two children, as a Righteous Among the Nations by Yad Vashem.

== Early life ==
Paulavičius was born in Lithuania to a poor family of farmers, as the third of six children. In his youth, he learned the craftwork of carpentry, and later worked as a carpenter for the Lithuanian railway company. In 1918, when Lithuania became an independent country, Paulavičius volunteered as a soldier in the Lithuanian army and fought in the Lithuanian Wars of Independence. When the wars of independence ended he became the owner of land in the suburbs of Kaunas, near the bank of the Neman River. There he built a house for his new family - his wife Antonia and their two children. The family cultivated its lands and practiced agriculture.

== Activity during World War II ==
Paulavičius politically leaned to the left. In 1941, when the Nazis occupied Lithuania, he helped his Communist friends and even held Communist secret meetings in his family's house. Paulavičius wasn't a communist himself, yet he was affected by the communist ideas. Nevertheless, this was not the most influential factor on his actions. Paulavičius was described as a person who was motivated by his emotions and love of human beings rather than any ideology. Shortly after the occupation, the Kovno Ghetto was established and Lithuanian Jews were forced there.

In 1944 a friend of Paulavičius suggested he save a four-year-old Jewish child, from the Kovno Ghetto. After Paulavičius consulted with his wife Antonia, they agreed to take the child and hide him in their house.

After a couple of months, it was too difficult and dangerous for Paulavičius and his family to keep the child, Shimele, without his parents. Paulavičius decided to bring the woman and her spouse to his house too and at their request he included Shimele's grandmother. In order to hide them better he and his son built a bunker for the couple and their offspring. Paulavičius succeeded in building the bunker without attracting any attention.

When Paulavičius told the woman to come with her spouse he told her to bring another couple because there was enough room in the bunker. He preferred people with professions because there would be a need for those people after the war.

Over time, Paulavičius saved more Jews and gathered them in bunkers in his house and in its surroundings. In those bunkers, Paulavičius also hid two Soviet POWs. The rescue work gradually became not only a matter of hiding and feeding. Paulavičius actively searched for people who were in need of his help. Sometimes he followed heavy guarded death marches, hoping to find fugitives while risking his life more for the purpose of saving human lives. He constantly worked to provide appropriate conditions for the refugees and to encourage them in conversations. Paulavičius engaged in the illegal trade of military suits to finance their stay. He provided them with a radio, an improvised bathroom, coffee and showers once in a while. Paulavičius's treatment of the people he saved was, as described by one of the survivors, "as a mother and father jointly".

== Post-war ==
Paulavičius' work did not end with the war. When the survivors needed his help in order to immigrate and to escape the Communist rule, he provided them with the needed great amounts of money and with documents. When he was asked about the reason for these deeds he answered that the difficulties of saving them formed a mother-child connection, as if he had birthed them. Their connection did not allow him to let any harm be caused to them.

Later on, Paulavičius' house was ruined by a river flood. After another two months, his daughter died of Tuberculosis.

In 1952, Paulavičius was murdered in his sleep. The murderer was never identified.

== Honors ==
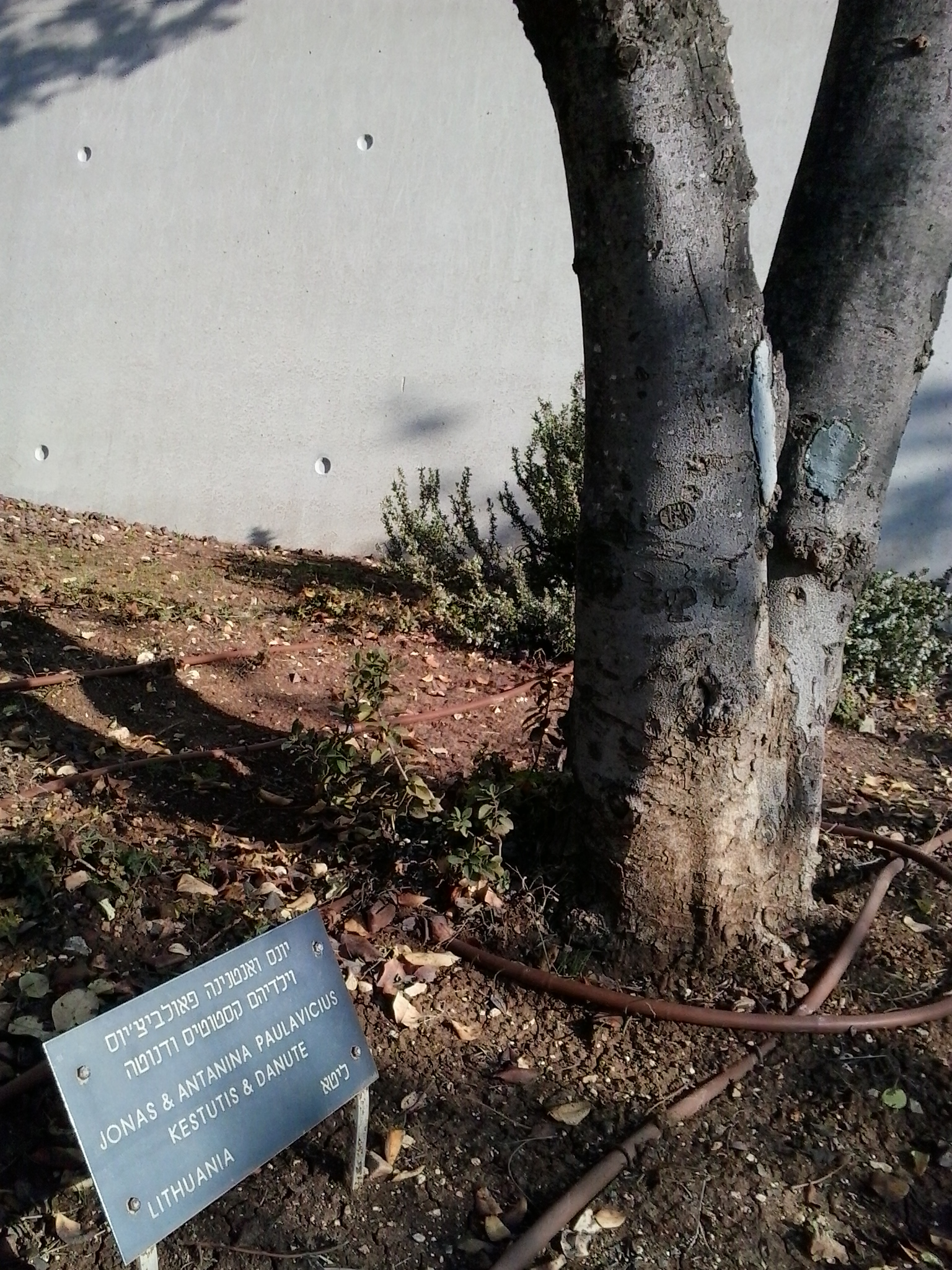
The tree that was planted in honor of the Paulavičius family.

- In 1983, Paulavičius, Antonia and their children were officially recognized as a Righteous Among the Nations by Yad Vashem. A tree was planted in their honor.

== See also ==
- Holocaust in Lithuania
- German occupation of Lithuania during World War II

== Bibliography ==
- Saving the Jews: Amazing Stories of Men and Women who Defied the "Final Solution". Pages 90–91.
