= Jonas Sima =

Swedish writer

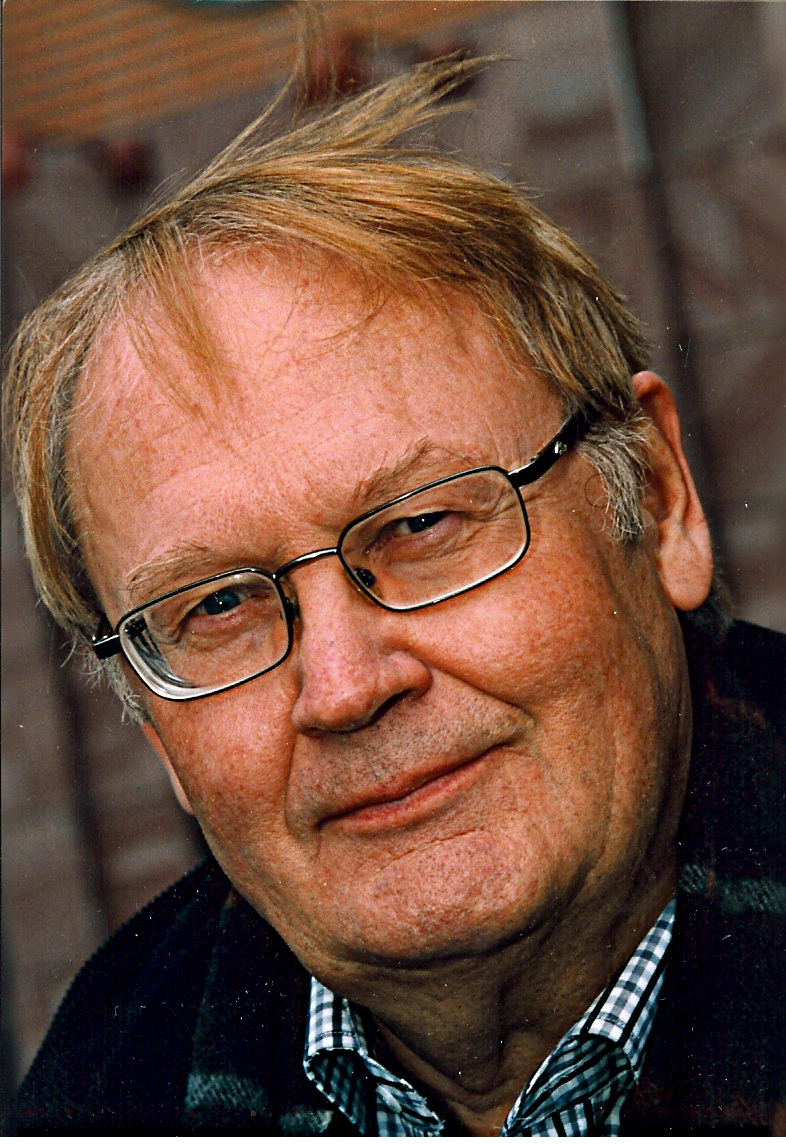
- Born: 31 May 1937; Hudiksvall parish
- Occupation: Film critic, film journalist

Gunnar Jonas Sima (born 31 May 1937 in Hudiksvall, Sweden) is a Swedish filmmaker, journalist, writer and educator.

== Biography ==
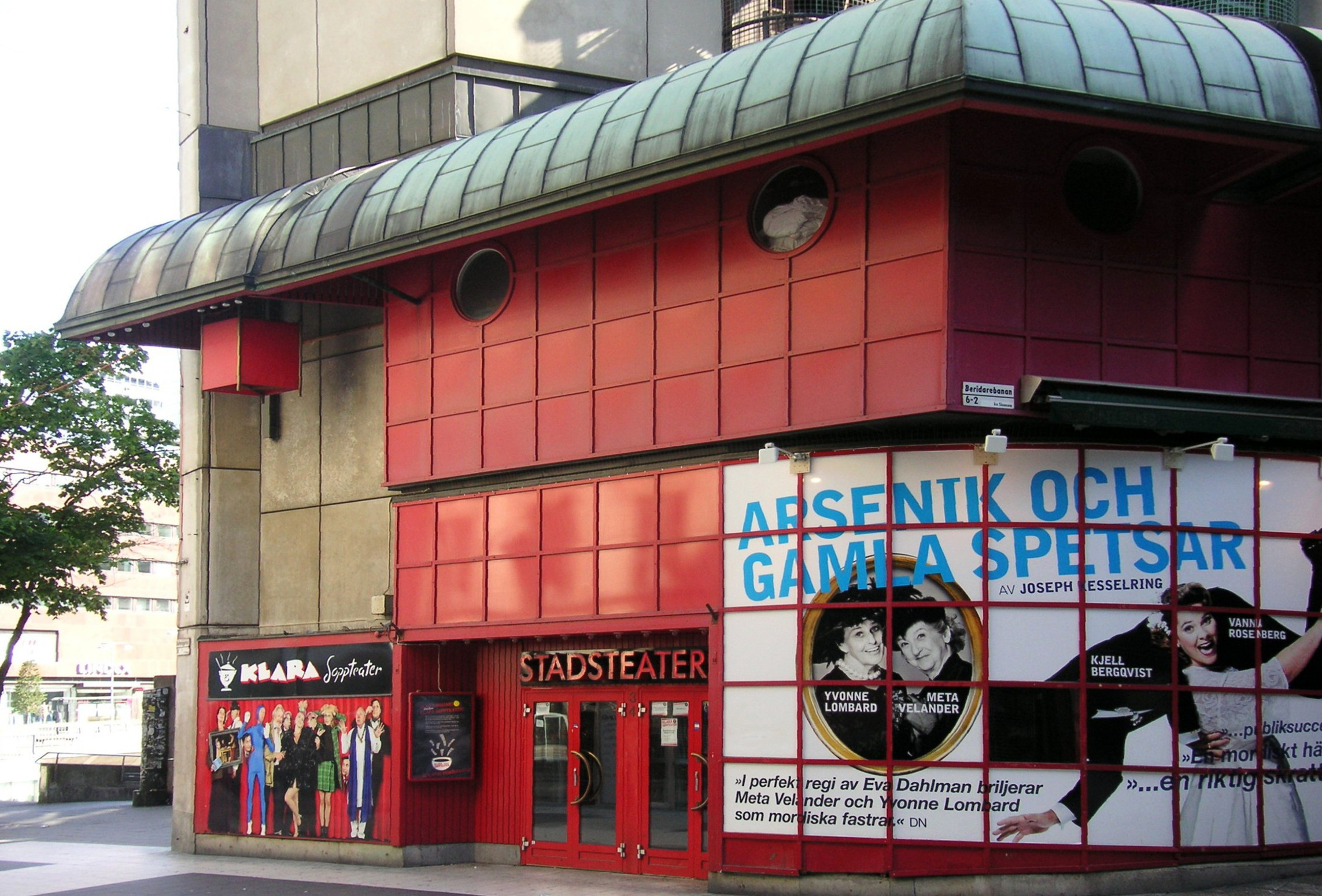
Stockholm City Theatre at Sergels torg and Drottninggatan

Though born in Hudiksvall, Sima grew up in Ljusdal in Gävleborg County. He has continuously served as secretary of the Hälsingland Academy since that cultural group was founded in 1988.

In the autumn of 2006 he stood for election to Parliament on the Social Democratic list in Stockholm, but with the party's popular vote declining to 35 percent, he was not one of the 130 MPs the party elected, and a centre-right coalition government led by the Moderate Party took office.

In recent years he has held positions on the board of the Stockholm City Theatre (1998-2006) and served as secretary of the Kulturarbetarnas socialdemokratiska förening ("Cultural Workers Social Democratic Union", known by its Swedish initials KSF), a left-leaning community of artistic workers centred on Stockholm.

Sima is married to Inger Edvardsson, an executive with the Swedish Film Institute; they have two adult daughters.

== Writing- and film-related activities ==
Sima was connected with the Swedish tabloid newspaper Expressen as a film critic for 11 years, followed by 22 years as a reporter. During the last two years before leaving the paper in 2000 he chronicled personal interviews for the tabloid's back page. He currently works as a freelance reviewer of movies and books, as well as a journalist and lecturer for the Arbetarnas bildningsförbund ("Workers Educational Association", known as ABF). He writes for movie magazines, political magazines and other publications, and regularly contributes columns for smaller Hälsingland newspapers, including Hudiksvalls Tidning, Ljusdals-Posten, Ljusnan and Söderhamns Kuriren.

Jonas Sima has coauthored more than 20 books, including the internationally acclaimed interview book Bergman on Bergman (1970, English translation 1993, ISBN 978-0-306-80520-2). He is one of the contributors to Murvelminnen: 46 journaliter berättar ("Reporting memories: 46 journalists' accounts", 2012) and has written three children's books about his Blåsjöbarna characters ("Blue Lake children", 1974–77).

He served as editor of three anthologies on the Hälsingland region, in one book writing about the influence of Nazi ideology in his homeland. Another work, Kalas-Praktika (2009), describes how to prepare sculpin soup. Another anthology, Citizen Schein (2010), has the theme of mastery of conflict and is devoted to Harry Schein (1924-2006), a writer and film critic for Dagens Nyheter who was instrumental in placing the Swedish film industry on a sound financial footing.

Jonas Sima has produced some 60 documentary films and two feature films, most shown on Swedish television. Recent productions include Filmaren i Storskogen (2009); Inget jävla joll! (2010); and Lisbet (2011), a conversation with Lisbet Palme, widow of assassinated Swedish Prime Minister Olof Palme and now a spokesperson for UNICEF and a member of the OAU team which investigated the Rwandan genocide of 1994.

== Filmography ==
- 2011: Lisbet
- 2004: Storsamlaren på Hillsta
- 2003: Solo
- 2002: Kalle Kamrat
- 1996: Vildhussen
- 1993: Dragspelskungen
- 1991: Putte à la clarinette and Putte på Stampen
- 1990: Ljuset i dalen
- 1988: De sista skidåkarna
- 1984: På tur med Tor
- 1983: Åke Hasselgård Story and Pipmäster
- 1980: Barna från Blåsjöfjället
- 1976: Hej Amerika, lyssna!
- 1974: Drömmål
- 1973: Cosmic Love and Döden tänkte jag mig inte så
- 1972: Oh, mein Poppe! and Revolutionen i Sveg
- 1971: Älgjakten and En filmförfattare
- 1970: Röde skräddarn and Välkommen till Grekland
- 1969: Matchen
- 1968: Porträtt av Per and Tage
- 1967: Kajsa
- 1965: Den våta stenen
- 1962: Dragarbrunn
