= Marcel Holovič =

Skovak ice hockey player

- Born: September 12, 1987 (age 37); Trnava, Czechoslovakia
- Height: 6 ft 0 in (183 cm)
- Weight: 196 lb (89 kg; 14 st 0 lb)
- Position: Left wing
- Shoots: Right
- Slovak 1. Liga team Former teams: HK Trnava; HK Nitra; HC '05 Banská Bystrica; HK 36 Skalica; ŠHK 37 Piešťany; MsHK Žilina; HKM Zvolen; Bratislava Capitals; HC Nové Zámky
- Playing career: 2006–present

Marcel Holovič (born September 12, 1987) is a Slovak professional ice hockey left winger for HK Trnava of the Slovak 1. Liga.

== Career ==
Holovič made his Slovak Extraliga debut with HK Nitra during the 2007–08 season. After playing with HK 36 Skalica and ŠHK 37 Piešťany, Holovič signed with MsHK Žilina. After two seasons, he moved to HKM Zvolen on June 8, 2018. He has played 530 games in the Slovak Extraliga up to the conclusion of the 2020–21 season.

== Career statistics ==
=== Regular season and playoffs ===
			Regular season					Playoffs
Season	Team	League	GP	G	A	Pts	PIM	GP	G	A	Pts	PIM
Slovak totals			472	106	145	251	204	58	6	18	24	30
