= Jonas Sela =

German footballer

Personal information
- Full name: Jonás Séla
- Date of birth: January 23, 1984 (age 42)
- Place of birth: Bensberg, Germany
- Height: 1.89 m (6 ft 2 in)
- Position: Goalkeeper

Team information
- Current team: SC Fortuna Köln
- Number: 1

Youth career
- –1996: TV Herkenrath 09
- 1996–2001: 1. FC Köln
- 2002–2003: SV Bergisch Gladbach 09

Senior career*
Years	Team	Apps	(Gls)
2003–2005	SC Fortuna Köln	29	(0)
2005–2007	1. FSV Mainz 05 II	30	(0)
2005–2007	1. FSV Mainz 05	1	(0)
2008	MVV		
2009	SpVgg Bayreuth	14	(0)
2009–2010	SpVgg Weiden	17	(0)
2010–	SC Fortuna Köln	13	(0)
- * Club domestic league appearances and goals as of 18:37, 10 February 2009 (UTC)

Jonas Sela (born January 23, 1984, in Bensberg) is a German football player, he is a goalkeeper for SC Fortuna Köln.

== Career ==
He spent two seasons in the Bundesliga with 1. FSV Mainz 05.
