= Jonas (footballer, born 1983) =

Brazilian footballer

Personal information
- Full name: Jonas Brignoni dos Santos
- Date of birth: 4 July 1983 (age 43)
- Place of birth: Ibirubá, Brazil
- Height: 1.88 m (6 ft 2 in)
- Position: Defender

Senior career*
Years	Team	Apps	(Gls)
2006	Gaúcho		
2007	Joinville		
2007–2009	Boulogne	25	(2)
2010–2011	Pelotas	41	(2)
2010	→ ASA (loan)	6	(0)
2011–2012	Brasil de Pelotas	12	(0)
2013	Veranópolis	18	(2)
2013–2015	Santo André	69	(4)
2015	Guarani	0	(0)
2016	Santo André	7	(0)
2017	Sergipe	23	(4)
2017	Botafogo-PB	0	(0)
2018	Anapolina	15	(1)
2018	Santa Helena	8	(0)
2019	Esportivo	8	(2)
2019–	Inter de Lages	3	(0)
- * Club domestic league appearances and goals as of 7 July 2019 (UTC)

Jonas Brignoni dos Santos (born 4 July 1983, in Ibirubá), or simply Jonas, is a Brazilian footballer who plays as a defender. Since June 2019, he plays for Brazilian club Inter de Lages.

== Honours ==
Santo André

- Copa Paulista: 2014
- Campeonato Paulista Série A2: 2016
