= Joseph Jonas =

German-born Lord Mayor of Sheffield (1845–1921)

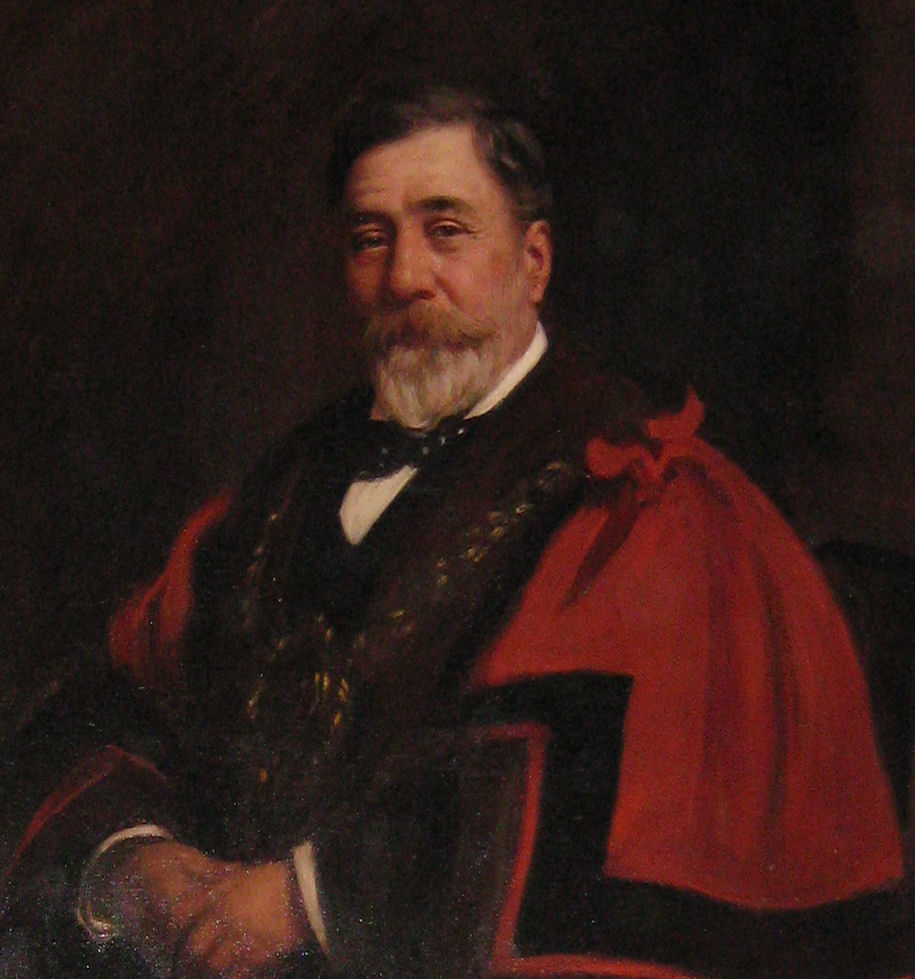
Jonas in Mayoral Robes. Portrait in Mappin Hall of the University of Sheffield

Joseph Jonas (1845 – 22 August 1921) was the German-born Lord Mayor of Sheffield, England in 1904–05.

== Background ==
Jonas was born in Bingen am Rhein, in the Grand Duchy of Hesse in 1845, and became a naturalized British citizen in 1876. The same year he married Lucy Ann Earle; they had five sons and one daughter. He had fled his home country in 1867 to avoid military service. He went to Sheffield in about 1870 to start a steel business. About two years later, Robert Colver of Western Bank joined him and the business became Jonas, Meyer and Colver. He prospered and with partners ran the Continental Steel Works, which by 1890 was one of the most successful in the area, particularly with its production of high speed steel.

He became a town councillor in 1890 and Lord Mayor in 1904. In 1905 he received a knighthood. He was a Justice of the Peace and a benefactor of the University of Sheffield, particularly the Applied Sciences, and also helped establish chairs in German and French. His picture now hangs in Mappin Hall of the university, and his mansion became student accommodation, Halifax Hall.

== Trial ==
In 1918, Jonas was charged with two others of conspiring to contravene the Official Secrets Act 1911 with regards to discussions about munitions with a German friend and customer in 1913. One of the defendants was released before the trial was concluded as there no evidence against him and Jonas and the other defendant were found not guilty of the main felony charges, but guilty of two minor misdemeanour charges. Jonas was fined £2,000 (equivalent to approximately £98,000 today) and the co-defendant £1,000 and ordered to pay the prosecution's costs. Following his conviction, Jonas's Knighthood was removed in August 1918.

On 11 March 1919, the Home Secretary informed the House of Commons that the case of Joseph Jonas had been "submitted to the Certificates of Naturalisation (Revocation) Committee constituted under the British Nationality and Status of Aliens Act, 1918. The Committee have reported that they are not satisfied that Mr. Jonas has shown himself by act or speech to be disaffected or disloyal to His Majesty. His certificate of naturalisation cannot, therefore, be revoked."

== Death ==
Joseph Jonas died in August 1921 from a stroke. He was buried in All Saints Church, Ecclesall. His funeral on 25 August 1921 was attended by many local dignitaries, including the Lord Mayor of Sheffield, the local MP and representatives of Sheffield University and the local chamber of commerce. After Jonas's death his widow remarried, to William Clegg.

== See also ==
- Edgar Speyer
