= Enteria arena =

Indoor arena in the Czech Republic

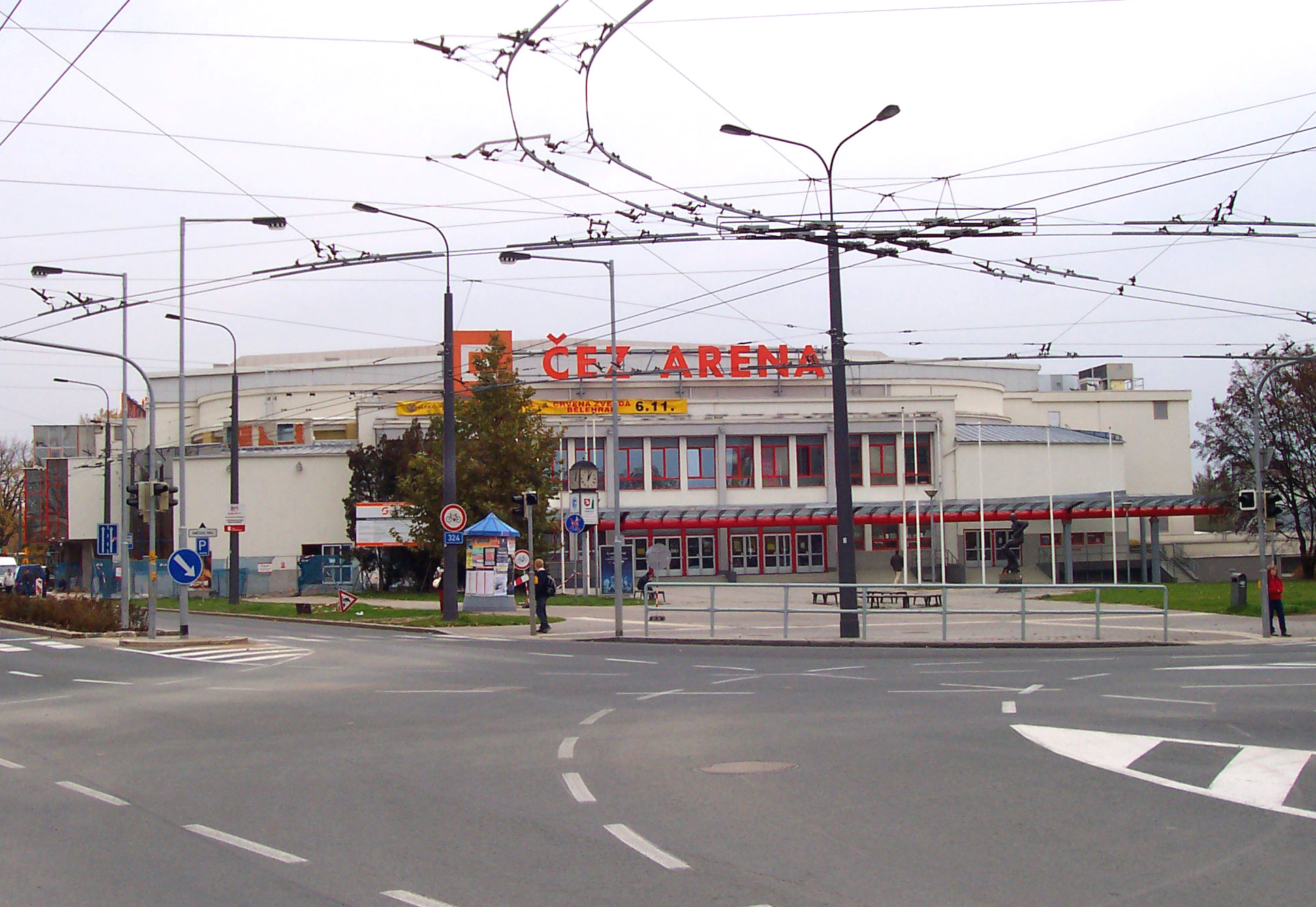
- Interactive map of Enteria arena
- Former names: Zimní stadion města Pardubic (1958–2001); Aréna Pardubice (2001–2003); Duhová Aréna (2003–2005); ČEZ Arena (2005–2015); Tipsport Arena (2015–2018); ČSOB Pojišťovna Arena (2018–2019)
- Location: Sukova třída 1735, Pardubice, Czech Republic
- Coordinates: 50°02′24.69″N 15°46′10.20″E
- Owner: Municipal Development Fund, Pardubice
- Capacity: Concerts: 10,000; Ice Hockey: 10,194; Basketball: 10,300

Construction
- Groundbreaking: 1958
- Opened: 1960
- Renovated: 2001, 2007

Tenants
- HC Dynamo Pardubice (Czech Extraliga) (1960–present); BK Pardubice (NBL)

Enteria arena (formerly Tipsport Arena or ČEZ Arena) is an indoor sporting arena in Pardubice, Czech Republic with maximum capacity of 10,194.

== History ==
The first artificial ice rink in Pardubice was built there in 1947, later being rebuilt into an indoor ice hockey arena in 1960. In 2001, it was completely renovated to become one of the largest indoor arenas in the Czech Republic. It is currently home to the HC Pardubice ice hockey team, as well as the BK Pardubice basketball team. It hosted the IIHF Ice Hockey World Junior Championships in 2002 and 2008, the IIHF Inline Hockey World Championships in 2011 and 2014, and the men's and women's 2017 Ball Hockey World Championship and Oktagon Prime 4 in 2021.

In 2015 the arena was renamed to Tipsport arena. In 2019 the arena was renamed to Enteria Arena.

== See also ==
- List of indoor arenas in the Czech Republic
