= Freddy Adu =

Former soccer player (born 1989)

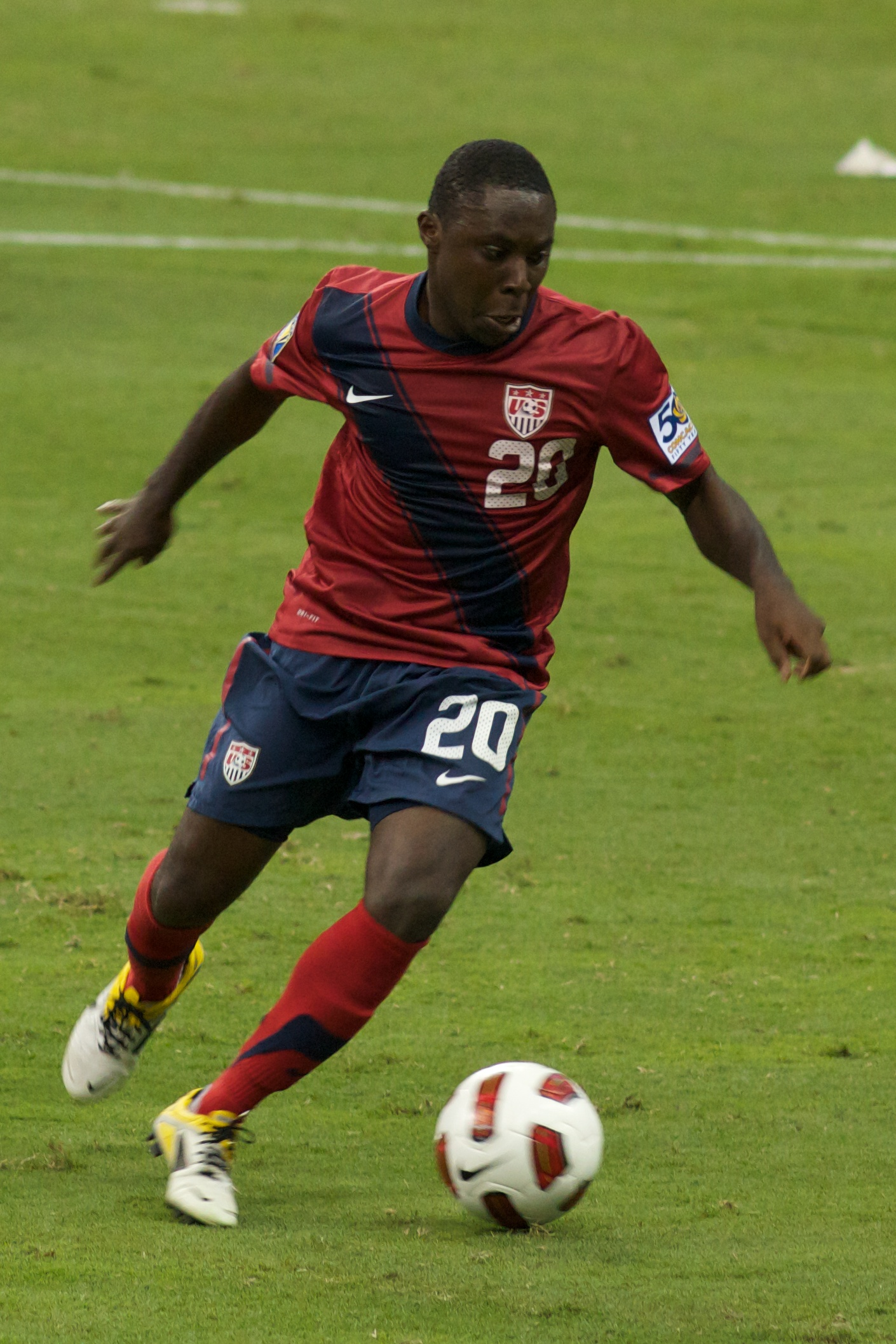
- Adu with the United States in 2011

Personal information
- Full name: Fredua Koranteng Adu
- Date of birth: June 2, 1989 (age 37)
- Place of birth: Tema, Ghana
- Height: 5 ft 8 in (1.73 m)
- Positions: Attacking midfielder; forward

Youth career
- 1997–2001: Potomac Cougars
- 2002–2003: IMG Academy

Senior career*
Years	Team	Apps	(Gls)
2004–2006	D.C. United	87	(11)
2007	Real Salt Lake	11	(1)
2007–2011	Benfica	11	(2)
2008–2009	→ Monaco (loan)	9	(0)
2009	→ Belenenses (loan)	3	(0)
2010	→ Aris (loan)	9	(1)
2011	→ Çaykur Rizespor (loan)	13	(4)
2011–2013	Philadelphia Union	35	(7)
2013	Bahia	2	(0)
2014	Jagodina	0	(0)
2015	KuPS	5	(0)
2015	→ KuFu-98 (loan)	3	(2)
2015–2016	Tampa Bay Rowdies	13	(0)
2018	Las Vegas Lights	14	(1)
2021	Österlen FF	0	(0)
Total		215	(29)

International career
2002–2003	United States U17	15	(16)
2003–2009	United States U20	33	(16)
2008–2012	United States U23	11	(5)
2006–2011	United States	17	(2)
Medal record
Representing United States
Men's soccer
FIFA Confederations Cup
Runner-up	2009 South Africa
CONCACAF Gold Cup
Runner-up	2009 United States
Runner-up	2011 United States
- * Club domestic league appearances and goals

Fredua Koranteng "Freddy" Adu (born June 2, 1989) is a former professional soccer player who played as an attacking midfielder. Born in Ghana, he played for the United States national team. From before the time of his signing with D.C. United at age 14, Adu was spoken of as "the next Pelé". After leaving D.C. United in 2006, he became a journeyman, playing for 15 teams in nine countries: the United States, Portugal, Monaco, Greece, Turkey, Brazil, Serbia, Finland, and Sweden.

At D.C. United, Adu broke several records. First, he became the youngest athlete ever to sign a professional contract in the United States at 14 years old, after he was selected by the team in the 2004 MLS SuperDraft in January 2004. Three months later, he became the youngest player to appear in a Major League Soccer (MLS) game when he came on as a substitute against the San Jose Earthquakes. These records have both since been broken by Maximo Carrizo and Cavan Sullivan, respectively.

Adu made his full international debut for the United States national team at the age of 16 in 2006. He went on to earn 17 caps for his country, and was a part of the US squads at the 2009 FIFA Confederations Cup, as well as at the CONCACAF Gold Cups in 2009 and 2011. He also represented the United States Olympic team at the 2008 Summer Olympics.

== Early life ==
Adu was born in Tema, a city located 16 miles east of Accra, where he played soccer against men three times his age. In 1997, when he was eight, his mother, Emelia Adu, won a green card through the Diversity Immigrant Visa lottery, and his family moved to Rockville, Maryland, where he attended Sequoyah Elementary School.

In February 2003, Adu became a United States citizen. Soon after arriving in the United States, he was discovered by a local soccer coach and began playing with boys several years older. Adu attended The Heights School, a private school in Potomac, Maryland, for several years. While playing with the U.S. Olympic Development Program in an under-14 tournament against the youth squads of such traditionally strong Italian teams as Lazio and Juventus, Adu's team won the competition, he led the tournament in scoring, and he was named MVP.

== Club career ==
=== Signing with MLS ===
At the age of 14, Adu became the youngest American ever to sign a major league professional contract in any team sport when he was chosen by D.C. United as the number one overall pick in the 2004 MLS SuperDraft. In order to allow Adu to play close to home, MLS assigned him to D.C. United on November 18, 2003, working a deal with the Dallas Burn, who owned the top pick in the 2004 MLS SuperDraft. Dallas was compensated with a player allocation. Having already signed with D.C. United, Adu effectively became the first player selected in that draft, two months before it officially took place. D.C. United had previously signed American youngsters Bobby Convey in 2000 and Santino Quaranta in 2001—both aged 16 and the youngest players in MLS at the times of being drafted.

=== D.C. United ===
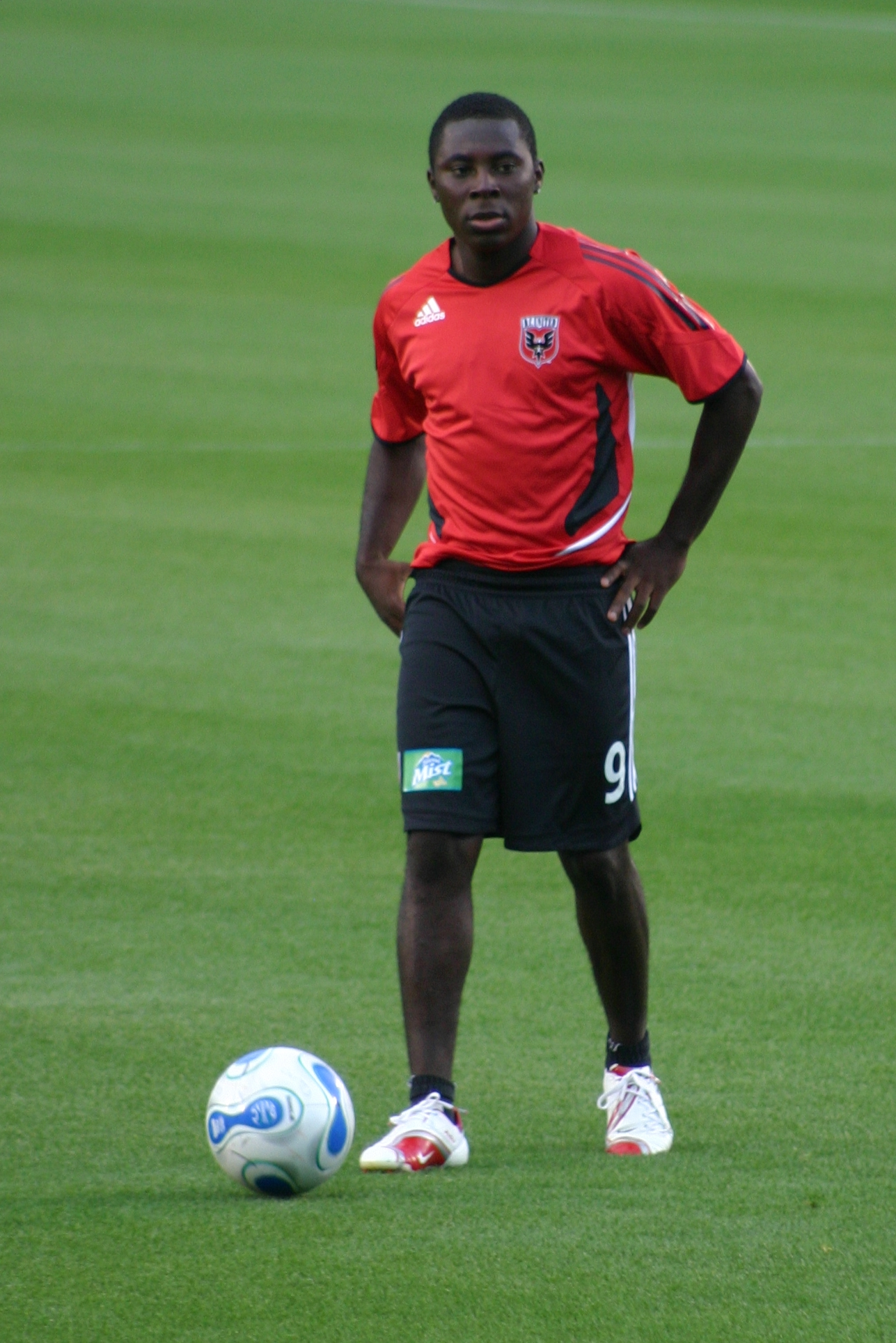
Adu playing for D.C. United

On April 3, Adu came on in United's first game of the 2004 season against the San Jose Earthquakes as a second-half substitute, making him the youngest player ever to appear in United States professional sports. On April 17, at the age of fourteen, Adu scored his first professional goal in the 75th minute of a 3–2 away loss against the MetroStars. In doing so, he became the youngest player in MLS history to score a goal. In his first season as a pro, Adu finished the year with five goals and three assists, while playing in all 30 regular season games. Although briefly a starter, Adu was relegated to a substitute when D.C. United acquired central midfielder Christian Gómez mid-season, and it was in this role that he appeared in United's MLS Cup victory. He played in three of four playoff games for D.C. United, assisting one goal during that time.

Adu was criticized from a number of different angles in his first season as a professional. Some commentators suggested that Adu was too young to be playing professionally and that he needed more time to develop mentally and physically among players his own age. In his second season, he was suspended for one game after he complained about his playing time in the media. During November 2006, Adu had a trial with English club Manchester United for two weeks, but he was not able to gain a work permit and so could not play in any competitive games, and only trained with several players from the Manchester United academy during his two weeks. Continued development, especially of his defensive skills, helped Adu become a starting midfielder during the 2006 season. In addition, Adu had been chosen to take spot kicks during D.C. United's two penalty shootouts—scoring on both attempts. He was selected to the MLS All-Star team twice, once as a commissioner's choice and once as the coach's. He was selected for the Best XI of the 2006 MLS semifinals by Soccer America magazine. In 2005, he was nominated for FIFPRO Young player of the year.

==== Real Salt Lake ====
On December 11, 2006, D.C. United traded Adu and goalkeeper Nick Rimando to Real Salt Lake in exchange for a major allocation, goalkeeper Jay Nolly, and future considerations. Adu made his debut for Real Salt Lake on April 7, 2007, playing the full 90 minutes in a 2–2 draw with FC Dallas. He scored his first goal for the club on May 20, 2007, converting a penalty kick in the 68th minute of a 2–1 loss to FC Dallas. Adu went on to score his second goal with Salt Lake from another penalty in a 1–1 draw in an exhibition against Boca Juniors. Adu was also captain of the U-20 United States men's national team in the 2007 FIFA U-20 World Cup, where he made an impressive showing. After the conclusion of that tournament, Benfica of the Portuguese Liga secured Adu's rights from MLS for a transfer fee of $2 million.

=== Benfica ===
On July 28, 2007, Adu opted out of playing for Real in their regular-season match, and later that day, boarded a plane to Portugal to negotiate with Benfica. On July 30, Benfica issued an official statement announcing that Adu had been transferred to their club. The following day, the signing was completed and he trained with the team in Lisbon. Adu cost Benfica US$2 million. On August 14, 2007, Adu made his debut with Benfica against Copenhagen in a UEFA Champions League qualifying match, coming into the game in the 37th minute as a substitute.

==== Loan to AS Monaco ====
In July 2008, Adu joined Monégasque club AS Monaco on a season-long loan, with an option to join the Ligue 1 club permanently at the end of the deal, an option that was eventually declined by Monaco. In July 2009, after participating in the Gold Cup game against Honduras, he returned to Benfica for training.

==== Loan to Belenenses ====
Adu was loaned to Portuguese club Belenenses for the 2009–10 season. On October 13, Adu made his first league start in Portugal, a 1–0 loss to Nacional. Adu was injured just before half time, and was substituted. In December 2009 Adu's season long loan was cut short.

==== Loan to Aris ====
Adu signed a 12-month loan deal with Greek side Aris in January 2010, joining fellow United States international Eddie Johnson. Assigned squad number 11, Adu made his debut on January 31 and assisted on a 90th-minute goal by Johnson. He scored his first goal on February 14 against Ergotelis.

==== Loan to Çaykur Rizespor ====
On February 1, 2011, Adu moved to Turkish Second Division side Çaykur Rizespor on what was his fourth loan deal away from Benfica. Adu made his debut for his new club on February 20. He set up teammates Mithat Yaşar and Gökhan Kaba with goals in a 3–0 win over Orduspor and was named Man of the Match. Two weeks later, on March 6, Adu scored his first goal for his new club in a 1–0 win over Gaziantep Büyükşehir Belediyespor.

=== Philadelphia Union ===
After his contract with Benfica expired in August 2011, Adu returned to Major League Soccer, signing with Philadelphia Union, reuniting him with former D.C. United and United States national U-23 coach Piotr Nowak. Though terms were not disclosed, as per club policy, it was stated that he was not a designated player. Adu debuted for Philadelphia Union on August 13 in a match against FC Dallas and scored his first goal for the club on September 7, 2011, against New England Revolution.

=== Bahia ===
On April 5, 2013, Adu joined Bahia of Brazil. The deal also saw Kléberson move in the opposite direction. He was released by the club on November 7, 2013.

=== 2014 trials ===
After his release from Bahia, in February 2014, Adu began training with Blackpool. At the end of February, they decided against offering Adu a contract, although they gave permission for him to continue training with the club to aid his fitness. In June 2014, Adu began training with Norwegian club Stabæk, managed by former United States national team coach Bob Bradley. In July 2014, Adu joined Dutch club AZ Alkmaar on trial, but he did not convince the club to offer him a contract.

=== Jagodina ===
After a trial with AZ that ended without a contract, Adu signed with Serbian club FK Jagodina on July 24, 2014. On July 25, it was announced that Adu had signed a one-and-a-half-year contract with Jagodina. Adu made his debut for Jagodina on September 24, 2014, coming on as a second-half substitute in a Serbian Cup match against FK BSK Borča. This was to be his only first-team appearance for the club. Adu was released by Jagodina, who opted not to renew his six-month contract, on December 21, 2014. Following Adu's release from Jagodina, Adu was linked with a move to the Swedish Allsvenskan in February 2015.

=== KuPS ===
On March 28, 2015, KuPS announced the signing of Adu on a one-year contract, subject to passing a medical. Adu also played some games for KuPS' reserve team SC Kufu in the Finnish third division. On July 7 of the same year Adu exercised an option in his contract to terminate it.

=== Tampa Bay Rowdies ===
On July 14, 2015, Tampa Bay Rowdies of the North American Soccer League announced the signing of Adu. Contract details of the signing were not disclosed. It was his 12th professional club. Adu made 13 appearances for the club before being released after the 2016 NASL season.

=== Las Vegas Lights FC ===
Prior to the 2017 MLS season, Adu went on trial with the Portland Timbers but was not offered a contract. Adu then went on trial with newly promoted Polish Ekstraklasa side Sandecja Nowy Sącz in August 2017. Adu joined the expansion Las Vegas Lights FC on a trial basis prior to the 2018 season. Adu was not selected for either of the team's first two preseason matches. He was selected for the third and final preseason match against his former club D.C. United, playing 30 minutes and contributing an assist—the first in club history—in a 4–2 defeat. On March 15, 2018, Las Vegas added Adu to the regular season roster. Adu made 14 appearances for the Lights and scored one goal for the club during the 2018 campaign. He was at the end of the season.

=== Österlen FF ===
On October 14, 2020, after a two-year hiatus during which Adu worked as a youth football coach in Maryland, it was announced that Adu had joined Österlen FF, recently promoted to the third tier of Swedish football. After signing with the club, Adu expressed his excitement to play professional soccer again, observing that he "skipped a lot of steps in the past but now he gets a chance to do it right". On February 16, 2021, after only a month in Sweden, it was announced that Adu's contract had been terminated by the Österlen FF administration after the club deemed Adu not being physically or mentally fit enough to be competitive in Ettan. Adu argued that internal conflict within the club was the reason for his exit. Adu told Swedish outlet Sportbladet in a written statement: "There is some kind of power struggle going on in the club." He added: "The coach (Agim Sopi) says that I was signed without his approval, which he does not like. I have been in a similar situation before and it never ends happily. It is better to deal with it immediately." Österlen manager Agim Sopi told Swedish outlet Fotbollskanalen: "He has said that he wants to resume his career and then I think you want to show yourself from your best side, but he was totally untrained when he came here. His physical status was zero." Sopi further commented on Adu's stint at the club, stating: "We gave him a chance a month or so to see. But when you are away for so long. He has barely trained with us. He has had defects all along and I do not see that he has the mental strength required to recover."

== International career ==
=== Youth teams ===
Adu played for the United States in five international youth tournaments: the 2003 FIFA U-17 World Championship in Finland, the 2003 FIFA World Youth Championship in the United Arab Emirates, the 2005 FIFA World Youth Championship in the Netherlands, the 2007 FIFA U-20 World Cup in Canada, and the 2008 Summer Olympics.

Adu captained the United States under-20 men's national team in January 2007 as it qualified for the 2007 FIFA U-20 World Cup in Canada. By playing in the 2007 tournament finals, held from June to July, Adu became only the second player in the world to play in three FIFA U-20 World Cups. On July 3, 2007, Adu scored a hat-trick in the United States' 6–1 victory over Poland in the group stage of the tournament. This accomplishment made him the first player to ever score a hat trick in both the under-20 and U-17 World Cups. In the following 2–1 victory over Brazil Adu assisted on both United States goals by Jozy Altidore.

Adu helped lead the under-23 men's national team in its campaign to qualify for the 2008 Summer Olympics in Beijing, China. He scored two goals from free kicks in the United States' 3–0 win over Canada in the semifinals of the tournament, which ultimately qualified them for the Olympics along with Honduras. He scored four goals in total in the three games in which he played, leading all players in scoring, and was selected to the tournament Best XI.

Adu was named to the 18-man squad that represented the United States in the 2008 Summer Olympics in Beijing. Adu played in the first two games of group play against Japan and Netherlands. He assisted on a Sacha Kljestan goal in the Netherlands match, but he, as well as teammate Michael Bradley, was then suspended for the final game of group play against Nigeria after each player earned his second yellow card of group play late in the Netherlands match. The US team was eliminated from the Olympics after falling to Nigeria.

=== Senior team ===
Adu was recruited early in his career by the Ghana national team. Although he was open to playing for Ghana, he ultimately decided against it. Adu was called into the United States national team's training camp by coach Bruce Arena in January 2006 for a friendly match against Canada. Adu was capped in that game on January 22 (at 16 years and 234 days), becoming the youngest player to appear for the United States national team when he replaced an injured Eddie Johnson in the 81st minute at Torero Stadium in San Diego, California.

Adu made his first start for the senior international team in a friendly against South Africa on November 17, 2007. Adu played in both legs of the 2nd round qualifiers for the 2010 World Cup against Barbados on June 8 and 22, 2008, starting in the latter. He provided the assist on Eddie Lewis' goal, the lone goal in the 2nd leg of the United States 1–0 victory (9–0 aggregate) in Barbados. Adu scored his first international goal (at 19 years and 170 days) as a member of the full United States national squad from a free kick in a November 19, 2008, World Cup qualifier against Guatemala.

Despite a two-year absence from the national team due to his increasingly unstable club situation, Adu was a shock inclusion in the United States roster for the 2011 CONCACAF Gold Cup, making the team despite playing for a second division club. After having failed to make an appearance in the team's friendly against Spain as well as the first four tournament matches, Adu was a surprise substitute in the semifinal against Panama, coming on in the second half of a scoreless draw for Juan Agudelo. It was Adu's pass from mid-field that freed Landon Donovan on a counterattack, where he was able to cross the ball to Clint Dempsey for the winner. Adu started the following game, the 2011 CONCACAF Gold Cup final vs. Mexico. He had a hand in both of the United States' goals as they lost 4–2.

== Career statistics ==
=== Club ===
Appearances and goals by club, season and competition
Club	Season	League			National cup		League cup		Continental		Other		Total	
Club	Season	Division	Apps	Goals	Apps	Goals	Apps	Goals	Apps	Goals	Apps	Goals	Apps	Goals
D.C. United	2004	Major League Soccer	30	5	1	0	—		—		3	0	34	5
D.C. United	2005	Major League Soccer	25	4	2	1	—		4	0	1	0	32	5
D.C. United	2006	Major League Soccer	32	2	2	0	—		—		3	0	37	2
D.C. United	Total		87	11	5	1	—		4	0	7	0	103	12
Real Salt Lake	2007	Major League Soccer	11	1	—		—		—		—		11	1
Benfica	2007–08	Primeira Liga	11	2	3	0	3	3	4	0	—		21	5
Monaco (loan)	2008–09	Ligue 1	9	0	0	0	1	0	—		—		10	0
Belenenses (loan)	2009–10	Primeira Liga	3	0	0	0	1	0	—		—		4	0
Aris (loan)	2009–10	Super League Greece	9	1	3	1	—		—		—		12	2
Çaykur Rizespor (loan)	2010–11	TFF First League	13	4	—		—		—		—		13	4
Philadelphia Union	2011	Major League Soccer	11	2	0	0	—		—		2	0	13	2
Philadelphia Union	2012	Major League Soccer	24	5	4	3	—		—		—		28	8
Philadelphia Union	Total		35	7	4	3	—		—		2	0	41	10
Bahia	2013	Série A	2	0	0	0	—		2	0	—		4	0
Jagodina	2014–15	Serbian SuperLiga	0	0	1	0	—		—		—		1	0
KuPS	2015	Veikkausliiga	5	0	1	0	—		—		—		6	0
SC Kuopio Futis-98 (loan)	2015	Kolmonen	3	2	—		—		—		—		3	2
Tampa Bay Rowdies	2015	North American Soccer League	8	0	0	0	—		—		—		8	0
Tampa Bay Rowdies	2016	North American Soccer League	5	0	0	0	—		—		—		5	0
Tampa Bay Rowdies	Total		13	0	0	0	—		—		—		13	0
Las Vegas Lights	2018	United Soccer League	14	1	1	0	—		—		—		15	1
Österlen FF	2021	Ettan Södra	0	0	—		—		—		—		0	0
Career total			215	29	18	5	5	3	10	0	9	0	257	37

=== International ===
Appearances and goals by national team and year
National team	Year	Apps	Goals
United States	2006	1	0
United States	2007	2	0
United States	2008	4	0
United States	2009	2	1
United States	2010	6	1
United States	2011	2	0
Total		17	2

Scores and results list United States' goal tally first, score column indicates score after each Adu goal.

List of international goals scored by Freddy Adu
No.	Date	Venue	Opponent	Score	Result	Competition	Ref.
1	November 19, 2008	Dick's Sporting Goods Park, Commerce City, United States	Guatemala	2–0	2–0	2010 FIFA World Cup qualification	
2	July 5, 2009	Qwest Field, Seattle, United States	Grenada	1–0	4–0	2009 CONCACAF Gold Cup	

== Honors ==
D.C. United

- MLS Cup: 2004

Aris

- Greek Football Cup runner-up: 2009–10

United States

- FIFA Confederations Cup runner-up: 2009
- CONCACAF Gold Cup runner-up: 2009, 2011
