= Zoran Jovanović =

Zoran Jovanović may refer to:

- Zoran Jovanović (basketball) (born 1965), Yugoslavian basketball player, see Yugoslavia national basketball team
- Zoran Jovanović (chess player) (born 1979), Croatian chess player, see List of chess grandmasters
- Zoran Jovanović (footballer) (born 1986), Swedish footballer
- Zoran Jovanović (politician), member of the House of Peoples of the Federation of Bosnia and Herzegovina
- Zoran Jovanović, silver medallist at the 1973 European Amateur Boxing Championships
