= Jonas Brorsson =

Swedish footballer

Personal information
- Date of birth: 12 July 1963 (age 63)
- Place of birth: Trelleborg, Sweden
- Position: Defender

Senior career*
Years	Team	Apps	(Gls)
1984–1987	Trelleborgs FF		
1988–1989	Gunnilse IS		
1990–1996	Trelleborgs FF		
- * Club domestic league appearances and goals

Jonas Brorsson (born 12 July 1963) is a Swedish former professional footballer who played as a defender. He is the current assistant coach of BK Höllviken.

Brorsson is the father of Franz Brorsson and Freddie Brorsson.
