= Franz Brorsson =

Swedish footballer (born 1996)

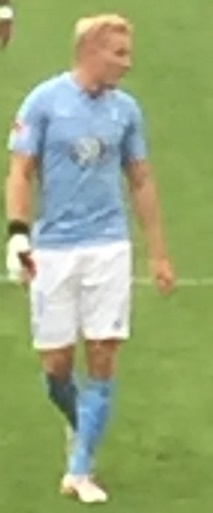
- Franz Brorsson playing for Malmö FF in a friendly match

Personal information
- Full name: Franz Denniz Brorsson
- Date of birth: 30 January 1996 (age 30)
- Place of birth: Trelleborg, Sweden
- Height: 1.86 m (6 ft 1 in)
- Position: Centre-back

Team information
- Current team: Asteras Tripolis
- Number: 16

Youth career
- Trelleborgs FF
- –2010: BK Näset
- 2010–2014: Malmö FF

Senior career*
Years	Team	Apps	(Gls)
2015–2021	Malmö FF	118	(2)
2020	→ Esbjerg fB (loan)	7	(1)
2022–2024	Aris Limassol	74	(1)
2024–2025	Atromitos	29	(0)
2025–2026	APOEL	28	(0)
2026–	Asteras Tripolis	4	(0)

International career^{‡}
2011	Sweden U17	2	(0)
2013–2015	Sweden U19	3	(2)
2016–2018	Sweden U21	15	(1)
2017–2018	Sweden	2	(0)
- * Club domestic league appearances and goals as of 20 September 2026 ‡ National team caps and goals as of 16 October 2018

Franz Denniz Brorsson (born 30 January 1996) is a Swedish professional footballer who plays as a centre-back for Super League Greece club Asteras Tripolis.

== Club career ==
=== Malmö FF ===
On 19 December 2014 Brorsson signed a first team contract for two years on a youth basis with Malmö FF. Brorsson had previously made his competitive debut for the club in the Svenska Cupen match against IS Halmia on 15 November 2014.

== International career ==
He made his debut for Sweden national team on 8 January 2017 in a friendly against Ivory Coast.

== Personal life ==
Brorsson is named after the former German footballer Franz Beckenbauer. He is the son of former footballer Jonas Brorsson and brother of fellow footballer Freddie Brorsson.

In January 2023, Brorsson, together with a friend, started a podcast which came under heavy criticism after the first episode featured the duo discussing "50 differences between men and women".

== Career statistics ==
As of 31 May 2025

Appearances and goals by club, season and competition
Club	Season	League			Cup		Continental		Other		Total	
Club	Season	Division	Apps	Goals	Apps	Goals	Apps	Goals	Apps	Goals	Apps	Goals
Malmö FF	2014	Allsvenskan	0	0	1	0	—		—		1	0
Malmö FF	2015	Allsvenskan	8	0	0	0	3 (Note: Appearances in UEFA Champions League)	0	—		11	0
Malmö FF	2016	Allsvenskan	18	0	5	0	—		—		22	0
Malmö FF	2017	Allsvenskan	23	0	1	1	2	1	—		26	2
Malmö FF	2018	Allsvenskan	23	0	3	0	10	0	—		36	0
Malmö FF	2019	Allsvenskan	9	0	0	0	5	1	—		14	1
Malmö FF	2020	Allsvenskan	13	2	0	0	2	0	—		17	2
Malmö FF	2021	Allsvenskan	24	0	3	0	10	0	—		37	0
Malmö FF	Total		118	2	13	1	32	2	—		163	5
Esbjerg fB (loan)	2019–20	Danish Superliga	7	1	1	0	—		—		8	1
Aris Limassol	2021–22	Cypriot First Division	16	0	—		—		—		16	0
Aris Limassol	2022–23	Cypriot First Division	32	1	1	0	2	0	—		35	1
Aris Limassol	2023–24	Cypriot First Division	26	0	4	0	10	0	1	0	41	0
Aris Limassol	Total		74	1	5	0	12	0	1	0	92	1
Atromitos	2024–25	Superleague Greece	29	0	2	0	—		—		31	0
Career total			228	4	21	1	44	2	1	0	294	7

== Honours ==
Malmö FF

- Allsvenskan: 2016, 2017, 2020, 2021
