= End Zone Militia =

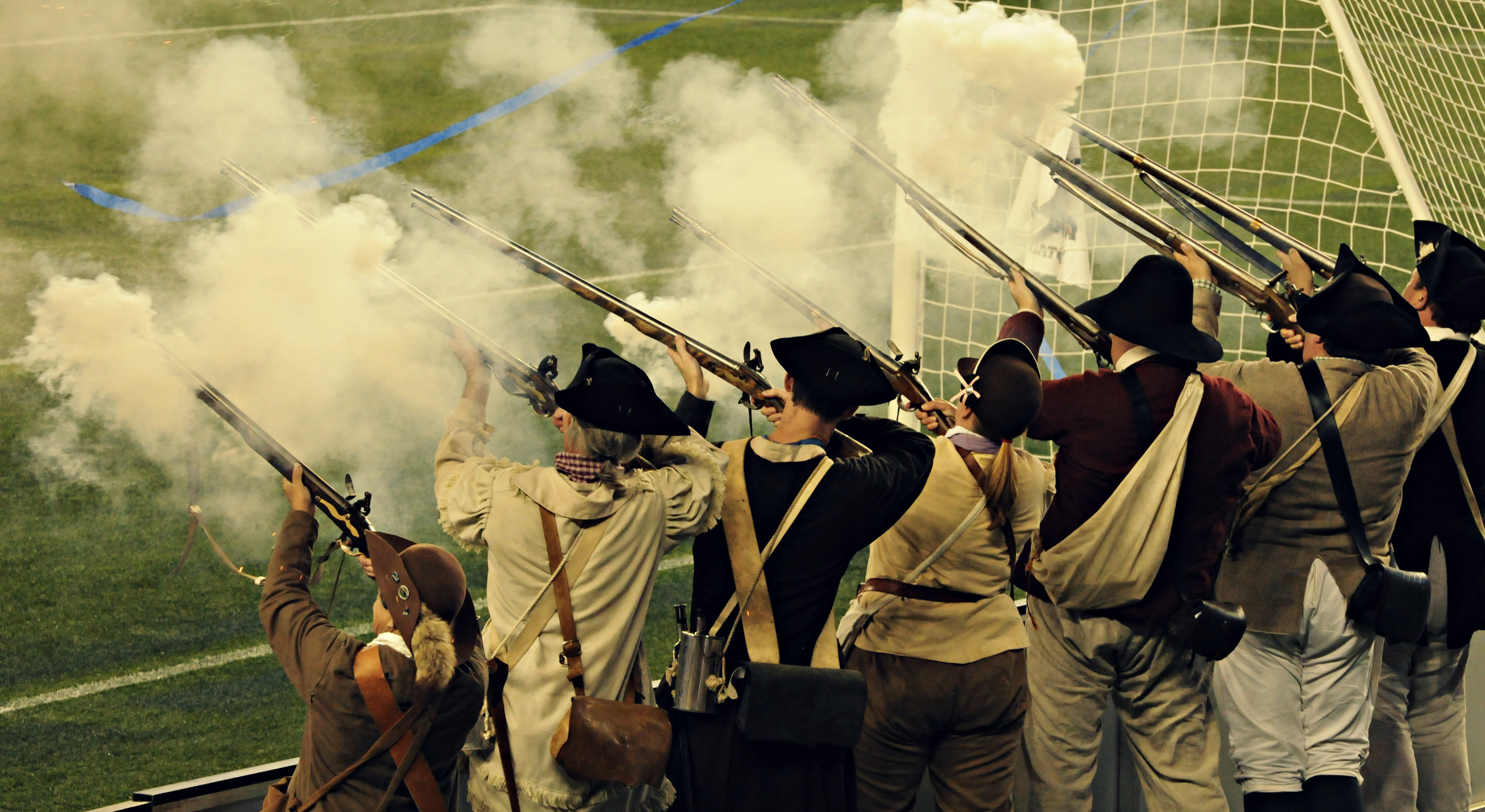
- The Militia firing at a Revolution game in 2013
- Founded: 1996
- Type: Supporters' group
- Team: New England Patriots; New England Revolution
- Location: Foxborough, Massachusetts
- Stadium: Gillette Stadium
- Website: Official website

The End Zone Militia is a group of fans who support the New England Patriots of the National Football League and New England Revolution of Major League Soccer, both of whom play at Gillette Stadium in Foxborough, Massachusetts.

Founded by Geoff Campbell in 1996, its members are part of the Ninth Massachusetts Regiment historical reenactment group and attend each home game dressed in the uniforms of Continental Army soldiers from the American Revolutionary War. They are situated by the end zone for Patriots games or goals for the Revolution, and fire blanks from their muskets when either team scores.

== Concept ==
The End Zone Militia consists of 30 to 50 reenactors, approximately 20 of whom stand on the side of the playing surface during games. They are expected to stand in formation for the entire game save for breaks during halftime or if they evacuate due to weather. Their proximity to the field also leaves them vulnerable to being accidentally hit by players going out of bounds.

When a New England score occurs, they fire blanks from flintlock muskets. At Patriots games, only the militiamen at the opposing end zone would fire for touchdowns while both do so on conversions; both sides used to shoot simultaneously until 2003 when the ensuing smoke caused kicker Adam Vinatieri to miss an extra point. Concerns were also raised about the smoke causing players' eyes to burn. Goals for the Revolution receive shots whereas penalty shots do not because their fast pace makes reloading difficult. An additional volley is fired after wins, while draws for the Revolution also get one. Volleys also come when the away team runs onto the field to intimidate the visitors.

Other stunts by the group include Campbell stabbing a plastic pony with his musket's bayonet to celebrate the Patriots beating the Denver Broncos in 1999 and letting sportswriter Rick Reilly dress up and shoot with them in 2015. Another tradition of the EZM is to be greeted by the Patriots' tight ends as they jog for pre-game warmups, which Ben Coates created in the 1990s.

Militiamen wear period-accurate colonial uniforms, which are tailored to withstand the region's extreme weather. Each member is allowed to personalize their clothing, such as feathers in their tricornes or carrying canteens and sacks. Certain occasions also allow for changes contrary to historical accuracy like pink feathers and socks to commemorate Breast Cancer Awareness Month and athletic underwear for colder environments. The muskets are authentic firearms loaded with approximately 200 grains of gunpowder per volley, and produce 113.3 decibels of noise upon being shot. The militia typically uses roughly three-quarters of a pound of black powder. In total, the gear can cost over $2,500.

The militia is officially employed by the Kraft Group for games, being paid $13.50 per hour to cover the costs of travel and gunpowder. They were originally volunteers before being hired by the organization in 2011. As such, the EZM often participates in Patriots functions outside of games such as Super Bowl victory parades and charity events.

Potential members must have been in a reenactment group for at least five years. Applicants are placed on a waitlist that only advances if an existing member dies or leaves. Women are also part of its ranks. Outside of the militia, its members work in other occupations.

== History ==
The Ninth Massachusetts Regiment, also known as the Braintree Third Volunteer Militia, is a Braintree-based reenactment organization whose namesake would later become the 26th Continental Regiment. The Campbell family are longtime members of the group, with patriarch Gordon Campbell serving for over 30 years. His son Geoff Campbell had been a captain in the regiment since 1975, while Geoff's children have also been members.

Geoff, a full-time reenactor for the Freedom Trail. took interest in the Revolution upon the team's reveal because of their name. Upon speaking with the team, he received approval to accompany the color guard before Revolution games starting in 1996. The group was situated near the ticket stand at Foxboro Stadium, where they greeted incoming fans, and proved popular enough to be asked to return when they did not appear in 1997. The Patriots invited them to appear at their games beginning 1998.

Patriots radio personality Pete Brock gave the group the "End Zone Militia" name in 2000. 2001 marked the first season of a formal partnership between the militia and the Patriots as the latter won Super Bowl XXXVI. During the year, the militia did not fire volleys for a month and a half in the wake of the September 11 attacks.

Foxboro Stadium's small size meant only six militiamen could fit on the sideline at a time. The larger Gillette Stadium, on the other hand, can accommodate over 20.

At the start of the 2009 season, the militia also fired volleys on kickoffs. The public address system would play the AC/DC song "Thunderstruck", with the militiamen firing upon reaching the song title in the chorus. It was dropped upon protest by the Atlanta Falcons because it distracted the kick returner.

After the Sandy Hook Elementary School shooting in 2012, the End Zone Militia agreed to not bring their muskets to the next game against the San Francisco 49ers. The members applauded scores and saluted the American flag instead. Due to the debate surrounding gun violence in the United States, the Revolution rarely depicts the militia in promotional material and social media posts.

When the 2020 MLS season was impacted by the COVID-19 pandemic, the militia continued to appear at Revolution games despite being played behind closed doors. Only five militiamen were also permitted to appear per game, and they were ordered to stand on Gillette Stadium's bridge rather than in the stands. Once pandemic restrictions loosened in 2021, they were assigned a concourse area behind the supporters' section.

The EZM has also appeared at events outside of Gillette Stadium, such as being the color guard at Boston Red Sox games on Patriots' Day. In 2017, the militia opened the Connecticut River Roll and Stroll Street Festival at Vietnam Memorial Bridge.

== Reception ==
The End Zone Militia is a beloved aspect of the region's sports culture. Campbell remarked in 2017 that there have been instances where members were propositioned by Patriots fans, joking that "I don't necessarily discourage it. It depends on whether the guy's married or not." The militia was represented in a 2022 advertising campaign by Plymouth Rock Assurance that focused on icons of Boston sports. Bank of America, the official bank of the Patriots, ran a newspaper ad in 2008 that proclaimed, "You know the End Zone Militia is not there to stop players from entering."

Pablo Maurer of The Athletic described the militia as a relic of American soccer's quirkiness from the 1990s as opposed to the modern MLS that has adopted European influences.

Players have also remarked on their presence. During his stint with the Patriots, running back LeGarrette Blount celebrated touchdowns by posing with the militia. Prior to a game against the San Diego Chargers, the EZM performed their volley next to the Chargers' tunnel and startled LaDainian Tomlinson; NFL commissioner Roger Goodell, who was in attendance, laughed at the scene and asked if Campbell saw Tomlinson's reaction. When the Patriots hosted the Cincinnati Bengals in 2010, Bengals receiver Chad Ochocinco expressed interest in borrowing a musket if he scored. The Patriots contacted the Bengals' front office to warn them of the possible act and its dangers. Although he caught a touchdown, Ochocinco did not attempt the celebration since the militia was on the opposite side of the field while his team was trailing 31–17 at the time.
