= Zoran Jovanović (footballer) =

Swedish footballer

Personal information
- Full name: Zoran Jovanović
- Date of birth: 25 September 1986 (age 40)
- Place of birth: Sweden
- Height: 1.71 m (5 ft 7 in)
- Position: Midfielder

Team information
- Current team: Österlen FF (player-assistant)
- Number: 33

Youth career
- IFK Malmö

Senior career*
Years	Team	Apps	(Gls)
2003–2008	IFK Malmö	25	(8)
2009–2019	Trelleborgs FF	196	(43)
2011	→ IF Limhamn Bunkeflo (loan)	25	(8)
2020–	Österlen FF	53	(11)

Managerial career
- 2021–: Österlen FF (player-assistant)
- 2021: Österlen FF (interim coach)
- * Club domestic league appearances and goals as of 20:51, 23 October 2022 (UTC)

Zoran Jovanović (born 25 September 1986) is a Swedish footballer who plays for Österlen FF.

== Career ==
=== Club career ===
Ahead of the 2020 season, Jovanović signed a one-year deal with Swedish second division club Österlen FF. Ahead of the 2021 season, Jovanović was given a role as a playing assistant coach at the club. In November 2021, he became temporary head coach for the final two games of the season after Agim Sopi was allowed to leave the club fired.
