= New England Revolution =

American soccer club in Greater Boston

- Full name: New England Revolution
- Nickname: The Revs
- Short name: NE
- Founded: 1995; 31 years ago
- Stadium: Gillette Stadium; Foxborough, Massachusetts
- Capacity: 20,000 (Note: Expandable to 65,878.)
- Owner: Robert Kraft
- President: Brian Bilello
- Head coach: Marko Mitrović
- League: Major League Soccer
- 2026: Eastern Conference: 3rd Overall: 4th Playoffs: TBD
- Website: revolutionsoccer.net
Home colors	Away colors	Third colors

The New England Revolution are an American professional soccer club based in the Greater Boston area. The club competes in Major League Soccer (MLS) as a member of the Eastern Conference. It is one of the ten charter teams of MLS, having competed in the league since its inaugural season.

The club is owned by Robert Kraft, who also owns the New England Patriots along with his son, Jonathan Kraft. The name "Revolution" refers to the New England region's significant involvement in the American Revolution, which took place from 1775 to 1783.

New England plays their home matches at Gillette Stadium in Foxborough, Massachusetts, located 21 miles (34 km) southwest of downtown Boston. The club played their home games at the adjacent and now-demolished Foxboro Stadium, from 1996 until 2001. The Revs are the only original MLS team to have every league game in their history televised.

The Revolution won their first major trophy in the 2007 U.S. Open Cup. The following year, they won the 2008 North American SuperLiga. They won their first Supporters' Shield in 2021. The Revolution have participated in five MLS Cup finals from 2002 to 2014, which are the most of clubs who have not won the MLS Cup.

== History ==
=== The early years (1996–2001) ===
Soccer has a long history in the New England region. In 1862, the Oneida Football Club in Boston was the first organized team to play any kind of "football/soccer" in the United States. In the 1920s, the Boston Soccer Club (later renamed the Bears) and Fall River F.C. were formed and played in the professional American Soccer League, which comprised teams based in the Northeastern U.S. region. The 'Marksmen' were one of the most successful soccer clubs in the United States, winning the National Challenge Cup four times. At the inaugural FIFA World Cup in 1930 in Uruguay, Bert Patenaude (from Fall River, Massachusetts) scored the first hat-trick in World Cup play. The American team finished in third place. The Boston area was next represented by the New England Tea Men (1978–80) and Boston Minutemen (1974–76), who played in the FIFA-backed, major professional North American Soccer League (NASL). However, each club struggled for financial solvency and folded. The NASL folded in 1984, leaving the United States without a major professional top-level soccer league until Major League Soccer (MLS) began play in 1996.

The success of the 1994 FIFA World Cup (with Foxboro Stadium as one of nine venues) paved the way for a new era of sports in the Boston area and to bring professional soccer back to the region. On June 6, 1995, Robert Kraft became the founding investor/operator of the Revolution, joining Major League Soccer (MLS) as one of its 10 charter clubs for its inaugural season in 1996. Kraft is also the owner of the National Football League's (NFL) New England Patriots and CEO of the Kraft Group.

The Revolution were the last of the MLS charter clubs to name a head coach, ultimately selecting Frank Stapleton on January 4, 1996, after conducting interviews with Osvaldo Ardiles and Brian Quinn. The Revolution played their first-ever league match on April 13, 1996, a 3–2 loss away to the Tampa Bay Mutiny. The match saw the Revolution's first goal in club history scored by Robert Ukrop in the 20th minute (he would score the second goal in club history in the 71st minute). The Revolution recorded their first-ever club win a week later on April 20, a 1–0 victory over the MetroStars courtesy of a Nicola Caricola own goal. The Revolution played its first home match on April 27, 1996, beating D.C. United in a shoot-out in front of 32,864 fans at Foxboro Stadium.

The inaugural Revolution team featured several U.S. Men's national team regulars returning from abroad to be part of the new league. Despite the presence of Alexi Lalas, Mike Burns, and Joe-Max Moore, however, the team was one of only two that failed to make the playoffs of the then 10 team league. Stapleton clashed with several Revolution players, with Lalas and defender Iain Fraser requesting trades. Stapleton would resign at the conclusion of the season, on September 26, with a record of 15 wins and 17 losses.

In November, Thomas Rongen, who had led Tampa Bay to the Supporter's Shield the prior season, was appointed as Stapleton's replacement. In 1997 the Revolution qualified the playoffs for the first time in team history, buoyed by the stand-out play of pre-season acquisition Walter Zenga and All-stars Alexi Lalas and Ted Chronopoulos. However the Revolution failed to advance past the first round, losing in the Conference Semifinals home and away to D.C. United. For the next five years, this playoff result would be the Revs' best (which they matched in the 2000 season), as a revolving door of players and head coaches failed to make much of an impact on the fledgling league.

In February 1998, the Revolution participated in the first three-team trade in league history, ultimately signing 1997 All-star and D.C. United stand-out striker Raúl Díaz Arce. Arce recorded 18 goals and 8 assists for the Revolution in 1998, but the team were unable to build on the success of the prior campaign, and Rongen announced his resignation on August 24. Zenga stepped in as manager for the remaining six matches of the season, and was named the league's first player-manager on October 28.

In 1999, The Revolution traded for National Team captain John Harkes, as well as 1996 MLS All-Star Giovanni Savarese. Despite these additions, the team again missed the playoffs, and only recorded one additional win over their 1998 campaign. Zenga was relieved of his coaching and playing duties on September 30. Steve Nicol concluded the season as Revolution interim manager, and Fernando Clavijo was named head coach on November 29.

Clavijo led the Revolution to a .500 record - the best tally in the club's history until that point, and also led them back to the playoffs for the first time since the 1997 season. Pre-season addition Wolde Harris led the club in scoring with 15 goals. The Revolution would again fail to advance beyond the first round of the playoffs, but did manage to record their first-ever playoff win, a 2–1 result over the Chicago Fire thanks to goals from Eric Wynalda and Mauricio Wright. Harkes represented the Revolution in the 2000 MLS All-Star Game.

The Revolution made history in the 2000 U.S. Open Cup, becoming the first-ever MLS team to lose to an amateur club, when they were defeated in the second round at home by the Mid Michigan Bucks 1–0.

The Revolution began their 2001 campaign with six straight defeats. They managed only 7 victories in the season, but did manage to make the final of the 2001 U.S. Open Cup - ultimately losing to the Los Angeles Galaxy on a golden goal by Danny Califf. It was a harbinger of finals to come for the Revolution.

Attendance in these early years was high despite the team's poor on-field performances. More than 15,000 people per match regularly came to watch the Revolution play in the old Foxboro Stadium in Foxborough, Massachusetts.

=== Steve Nicol era (2002–2011) ===
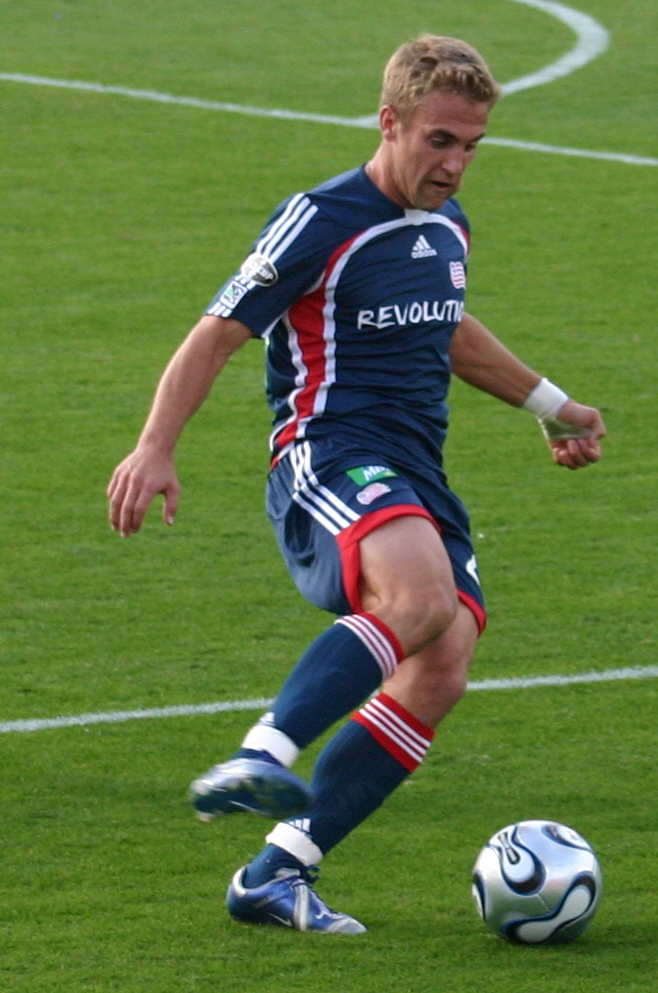
Taylor Twellman was an integral part of the Revs' success, leading them to four MLS Cup finals

Liverpool great Steve Nicol was appointed as head coach on a full-time basis during the 2002 season. He had previously held the position of interim head coach during the 1999 and 2002 seasons. After taking over, Nicol guided the Revolution to a playoff berth for a league-record eight straight seasons, failing for the first time in 2010. The first six of those berths (from 2002 to 2007) resulted in an appearance in the conference final or better, including three consecutive MLS Cup finals from 2005 to 2007. From the 2008 season until 2013, the Revs failed to go further than the first round of the playoffs. Still, Nicol was respected as one of the best coaches in the league.

==== Playoff success (2002–2007) ====
In his first season in charge, Nicol guided the Revs to a first-place finish in the Eastern Conference. The team advanced through the playoffs to MLS Cup 2002, where they lost to the Galaxy again, this time 1–0 on a golden goal by Carlos Ruiz. Held at Gillette Stadium, the Cup final was attended by 61,316 spectators, the largest figure for any MLS Cup until MLS Cup 2018, and the largest for a Revolution match until 2024.

==== Consecutive MLS Cup finals ====
Craig Tornberg was officially named the Revolution's general manager on December 16, 2003. The 2003 New England Revolution season saw the Revolution's 3rd all-time hat trick, scored against the Chicago Fire on August 31 in a 5–1 win, by Revolution striker Chris Brown. In July 2003, the Revolution signed José Cancela from Deportivo Saprissa. On July 27, 2003, Gillette Stadium hosted a double-header, with FC Barcelona and Juventus FC playing at 4:00 pm as part of the ChampionsWorld Series, and New England playing DC United at 6:30. In front of 30,912 fans, the Revolution established a 2–0 lead on a brace from Twellman, with Cancela recording his first assist as a member of the team. However, an 83rd-minute goal by Eliseo Quintanilla, as well as three second-half, stoppage-time goals by Quintanilla, Dema Kovalenko, and Alecko Eskandarian, would see the Revolution enter the All-Star break with a 4–2 defeat. The Revolution set new club records for goals in a half (4) and total goals scored (6) in their 6–1 September 18 victory over Colorado Rapids.

In 2004, former England international, Plymouth Argyle F.C., and Ipswich Town F.C. legendary striker Paul Mariner would join Nicol's staff as an assistant coach.

After losing in the conference finals in 2003 and 2004, the Revs repeated their 2002 feat finishing tops in the east and losing the cup final to Los Angeles 1–0 in extra time again in 2005. New England had a real chance to win their first MLS championship, in MLS Cup 2006, against the Houston Dynamo. After Taylor Twellman scored in the 113th minute, the Revs allowed an equalizing header from the Dynamo's Brian Ching less than a minute later that sent the game to penalty kicks, where the Revs lost 4–3. Their 2002 MLS Cup appearance granted them a spot in the 2003 CONCACAF Champions Cup, but they lost their first match-up 5:3 on aggregate after playing two games on the road to LD Alajuelense. The Revolution again faced LD Alajuelense of Costa Rica in the home and away 2006 CONCACAF Champions' Cup. The "home" game was played February 22, 2006, in Bermuda despite some fans feeling that playing at Gillette Stadium in the adverse conditions of winter in New England could have been advantageous. The Revs failed to advance, as they drew 0–0 in Bermuda and lost 0–1 in Costa Rica.

In the 2007 season, the Revs made it to two cup finals. The 2007 MLS Cup was a rematch from the previous year, though the result was the same as Houston defeated New England 2–1.

In the 2007 pre-season, New England sold Clint Dempsey to Fulham F.C. for a club, and league, record fee of $4m. Jose Cancela was lost in the 2006 MLS expansion draft to Toronto FC. The Revolution announced in November 2006 that they were not exercising the contract option of José Manuel Abundis. Daniel Hernandez would return to Liga MX and sign with Club Puebla. Offseason acquisitions overwhelmingly came through the 2007 MLS Superdraft, in which the Revolution made a joint-highest 6 selections, with 2 in the first round, selecting Wells Thompson and Amaechi Igwe.

Despite early season injuries limiting Joseph, Parkhurst, Franchino, and Noonan, The Revolution flew out of the gates to begin their 2007 campaign. Filling in for Noonan, rookie striker Adam Cristman, who the Revolution drafted with he fifth-to-last-pick in the Superdraft, had a strong year, contributing 4 goals and 3 assists. He would ultimately finish the season as a finalist for 2007 MLS Rookie of the Year. After dropping their season opener 1–0 to Chicago Fire, the Revolution went on a 7 match, 5-0-2 unbeaten run, which included an impressive 3–2 victory against LA Galaxy in Carson, which saw an 84th minute Tyrone Marshall equalizer nullified one minute later by an 85th minute Taylor Twellman winner.

This unbeaten run was snapped on May 26 in a 4–3 loss to Kansas City Wizards which featured historic hat trick from Eddie Johnson, who became the first MLS player to net three times in back-to-back matches.

Although he did not play in the match, newly signed David Beckham would travel with the LA Galaxy to Gillette in August, and a goal from Twellman would see off the Galaxy 1–0 in front of a regular-season record crowd of 35,402 fans, the highest-ever for a regular season home Revolution home game, and the second-highest in Revolution history, only topped by the 2002 MLS Cup final.

Results were primarily positive down the back end of the season, and the Revolution ultimately finished second in the Eastern Conference behind only D.C. United, with a 14–8–8 record, qualifying for the MLS Cup Playoffs for the sixth consecutive season. In the final regular season match against Toronto FC, Michael Parkhurst would score his first ever MLS goal, beating Toronto keeper Kyriakos Stamatopoulos from beyond midfield. The goal was named a finalist for 2007 MLS Goal of the Year Award.

The team was represented by five players (and its head coach) in the 2007 MLS Allstar game. In addition to being named to the 2007 MLS League XI alongside Joseph, Parkhurst also won MLS defender of the Year and MLS Humanitarian of the Year.

The Revolution stumbled into the 2007 MLS Cup Playoffs winless in their last 3 final regular season matches, but began their run by holding the New York Red Bulls to a 0–0 draw, and ousting them a week later on November 3 thanks to a 64th minute Taylor Twellman goal. The single-leg Eastern Conference Final saw the Revolution match up yet again with Chicago Fire. A 38th minute bicycle kick goal from Twellman would be enough to steer the Revolution past the Fire to their fourth Eastern Conference Championship, and into the MLS Cup Final match for the third consecutive time.

MLS Cup was held at RFK Stadium on November 18, 2007, in front of a crowd of 38,859. For the first time in league history the match would be contended between the two same sides in back to back years, as the Revolution were once again facing off against Houston Dynamo. The Revolution would take a regulation-lead for the first time in their championship history when Taylor Twellman headed home a Steve Ralston cross in only the 20th minute of the match.

In the second half, Houston would switch its formation from 4–4–2 to a more aggressive 3–5–2. The Dynamo were without star striker Brian Ching, who had controversially been chosen over Twellman for the 2006 FIFA World Cup USA Squad. Nevertheless, they conceded two goals in the space of 13 minutes to Joseph Ngwenya and Dwayne De Rosario. Jeff Larentowicz nearly converted a diving header on a cross served in by substitute Andy Dorman in the 87th minute, but the effort was parried away by Pat Onstad.

The Revolution hold the record for most losses in MLS Cup games. Though they lost the 2007 MLS Cup, they defeated FC Dallas 3–2 to win their first-ever trophy: the 2007 U.S. Open Cup.

==== Rebuilding (2008–2010) ====
The 2008 season saw many pieces of the Revolution's MLS cup teams depart. After the 2007 season, contract negotiations with Andy Dorman fell through. He would sign for St Mirren F.C. in the Scottish Premiership. Pat Noonan's 2008 option was not picked up, and he signed with Aalesunds FK in the Norwegian Eliteserien, where he would join former Rev Adin Brown. Defender James Riley was selected by San Jose Earthquakes in the 2007 MLS expansion draft, and Marshall Leonard was waived by the club after six seasons. In April, long-time defender Joe Franchino returned to the LA Galaxy in exchange for a second round 2009 MLS Superdraft pick. In May, Avery John would sign with Miami FC.

To reinforce their defense the Revolution traded for 3-time MLS Cup Champion defender and U.S. international Chris Albright. They additionally added Hondauran international midfielder Mauricio Castro from C.D. Olimpia and eventual Costa Rican international striker Argenis Fernández from Santos de Guápiles F.C. as a "discovery player". In the summer transfer window, the club added Costa Rican international defender Gabriel Badilla from Deportivo Saprissa.

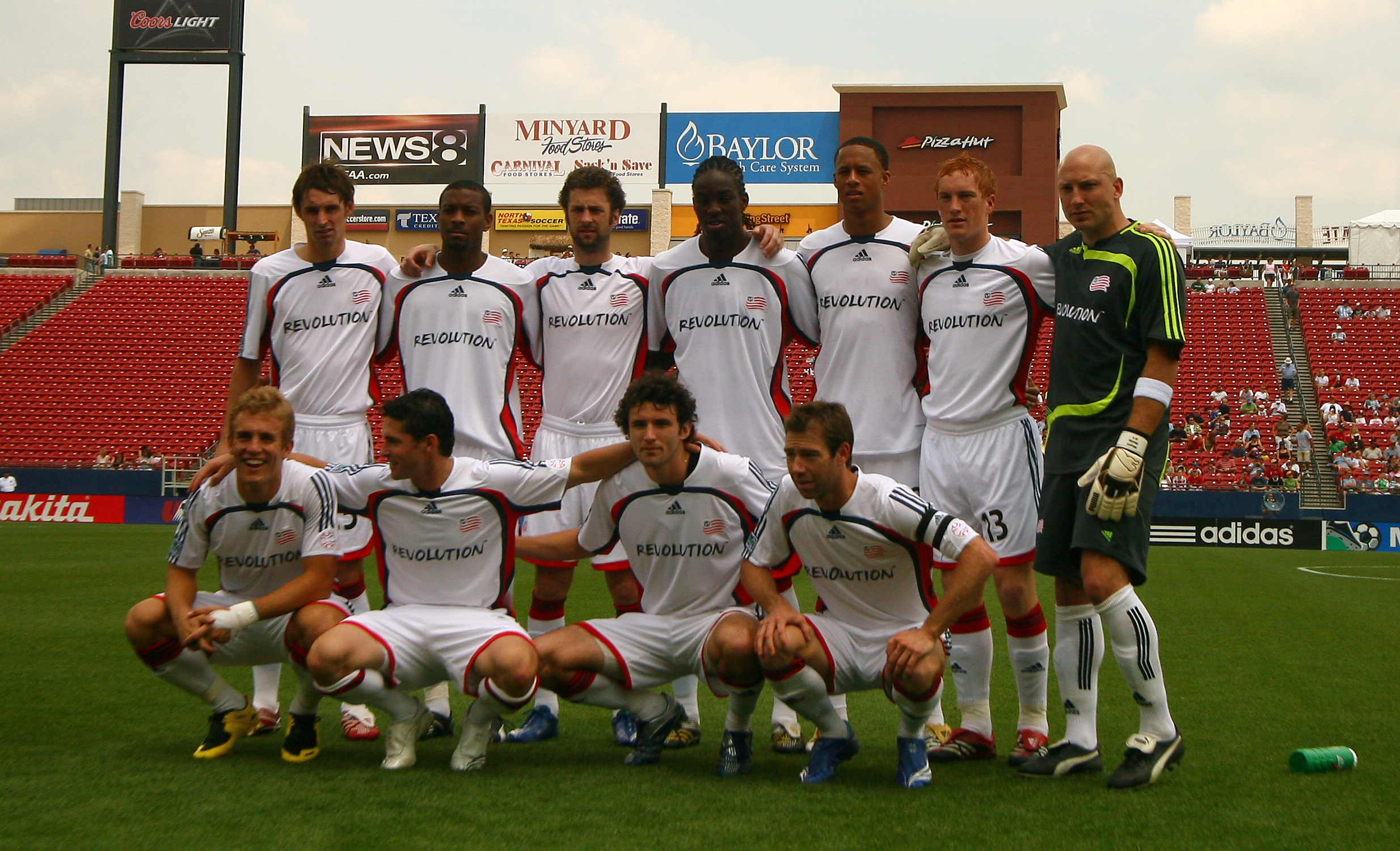
New England Revolution starting lineup photo in 2007

The 2007 U.S. Open Cup victory qualified the club for the preliminary round of the newly expanded CONCACAF Champions League. Additionally, their top-four finish qualified them for SuperLiga 2008. Therefore, the Revolution competed in four different competitions (MLS, Open Cup, Champions League, and SuperLiga) during the 2008 season. Uniquely, 2008 would mark the first time the Revolution would host a season-opening game.

The Revolution had an excellent run at the beginning of the 2008 season. By mid-July, they were leading the overall MLS table and had finished as the number one overall seed in SuperLiga. The team won the tournament, defeating Atlante F.C. in the semi finals, and the Houston Dynamo in the final on penalties to earn a small amount of revenge on for their successive MLS Cup defeats. The Revolution's 2008 Superliga campaign saw the team making news off the field news as well, when, while traveling to their Group B match against Chivas USA in July on American Flight 725, GM Craig Tornberg in tandem with Gwynne Williams and Michael Burns subdued a naked man who had emerged from the bathroom and was "speaking gibberish" and making a "beeline for the emergency door." The Federal Bureau of Investigation credited members of the Revolution with subduing the man, who was then taken into custody and placed under psychic evaluation. Two days later the Revolution would draw Chivas USA 1–1, securing their position atop Group B and earning in berth in the semi final.

The SuperLiga trophy, however, was the high point for the 2008 Revs. Fixture congestion led to a rash of injuries and general fatigue, and the team crashed out the Champions League with an embarrassing 4–0 home defeat to regional minnows Joe Public FC of Trinidad and Tobago (the tie ended 6–1 Joe Public on aggregate). The team also struggled in domestic play, limping to a third-place finish in the East and losing to the Chicago Fire in the first round of the playoffs 3–0 on aggregate. The Revs managed a semifinal appearance in the 2008 U.S. Open Cup, but lost to D.C. United.

2009

In 2009, the Revs continued the mediocrity that had plagued the second half of their 2008 season. In the 2008-09 offseason, the club lost Michael Parkhurst to Danish Superliga club FC Nordsjælland when his contract expired at the end of 2008.

Khano Smith was selected by Seattle Sounders FC in the expansion draft. Rhode Island native Nico Colaluca joined in a trade with Colorado Rapids, seeing Rob Valentino's tenure with the club end. Adam Cristman was traded to Kansas City Wizards in exchange for allocation money and a 2009 third-round draft pick. In the 2009 MLS SuperDraft, the Revolution made a league-leading seven total selections, notable amongst these were a pair of defenders: #10 overall pick Kevin Alston, and Darrius Barnes, who would become the only rookie in MLS to play every minute of the 2009 MLS season. At the end of March, the Revolution would add Ghanaian defender Emmanuel Osei.

The Revolution went 4 straight matches unbeaten to begin the season, but were then thumped 6–0 by eventual-champion Real Salt Lake at Rio Tinto Stadium, with all 6 goals coming in the second half. The loss was the heaviest in the Revolution's 14-year history to that point.

The Revolution would record some positive history, however, when Taylor Twellman became just the 5th player in Major League Soccer to record 100 goals, doing so with a brace in a 4–0 victory over New York Red Bulls on June 7 in only his second appearance of the year.

To bolster the club's offense, the Revolution added journeyman Lithuanian striker Edgaras Jankauskas in the summer window. his week 26 goal against the Kansas City Wizards was nominated for the MLS Goal of the Year Award.

The Revolution concluded their 2009 campaign in 3rd place in the Eastern Conference and in 7th place in the overall league table. Shalrie Joseph led the team in regular season scoring with 8 goals and was named to the 2009 MLS Allstar Game roster. The Revolution entered the playoffs for the 8th straight season, and took on Chicago Fire in the Eastern Conference Semifinals. The Revolution won the home leg 2–1 behind goals from Emmanuel Osei and Shalrie Joseph, but would lose the away leg 2–0, bowing out of the playoffs on aggregate after an 83rd-minute goal from Cuauhtémoc Blanco. This would be the Revolution's last playoff appearance for the next four years. The team also lost to Chicago in the semifinals of the 2009 North American SuperLiga.

2010

Analysts expected the 2010 season to be "interesting", as a rebuild was inevitable following the departure of yet more key pieces from the teams that had been so successful over the past six seasons. The 2009-10 offseason saw the retirement of Jay Heaps after 11 seasons, and also saw long-time captain Steve Ralston move to AC St. Louis after 11 years in the league and a league-leading 378 matches played. Long-time assistant coach Paul Mariner additionally would depart in the offseason, taking the reins at his former club Plymouth Argyle F.C. on December 10.

With Matt Reis still recovering from shoulder surgery, the Revolution were in need of a keeper to start the season, so they traded for former Southern New Hampshire University star Preston Burpo. The deal saw Jeff Larentowicz and Wells Thompson move to Colorado Rapids in exchange for Burpo and former Feyenoord defender Cory Gibbs.

In the 2010 MLS SuperDraft, the Revolution added Zack Schilawski and Seth Sinovic with their respective first and second-round picks.

On March 26, winger Khano Smith would mark his return to the Revolution after a pre-season trial. The club also signed Marko Perović on a free transfer from FC Basel. Perović would end up as the team's lead-scorer in 2010, and the winner of the team's 2010 MVP award.

On April 10, 2010, Steve Nicol recorded his 100th win as Revolution manager in the Revolution's 4–1 win over Toronto FC. In doing so Nicol became only the third coach in MLS history with 100 wins under his belt, and the only current coach to pass that milestone other than Sigi Schmid. In that victory, Superdraft pick Schilawski scored the ninth hat trick in Revolution history, and the first since Kheli Dube scored three times against Real Salt Lake at Gillette Stadium on August 23, 2009. Unfortunately, following that performance, the Revolution would win only one of its next eleven matches.

Despite the dismal start, which saw the team failing to put together an unbeaten streak longer than three games until July, the unbeaten streak coincided with the Revs' third consecutive SuperLiga appearance, and for the second time in three years, the team made the competition's final. In the 2010 North American SuperLiga, the Revolution finished atop Group B a perfect 3–0, defeating Chicago Fire FC, Pumas UNAM, and Monarcas Morelia by the same scoreline of 1–0. In the semi-finals, hosted at Gillette, a Kenny Mansally goal in the 56th minute would be canceled out by a goal from Nicolás Olivera two minutes later. The match would end in penalties, with the Revolution besting Puebla 5–3 after Reis, who converted a penalty, saved Edgar Lugo's to end the match.

The 2010 Superliga Final was hosted at Gillette Stadium on September 1, 2010, in front of 10,414 fans. The Revolution would once again play Monarcas Morelia, who they'd beaten in group play. A 79th-minute goal from Kevin Alston was not enough to offset Miguel Sabah's brace, and the Revolution would lose the championship 2–1. Results improved slightly in the second half of the season with the Revolution recording 5 wins, 7 defeats and 3 draws down the stretch. The Revolution would finish in 13th in the overall MLS table, 6th in the Eastern Conference and the season would mark the first in which the Revolution failed to qualify for the playoffs in Nicol's tenure.

==== Nicol's departure ====
The 2011 season would go down as the worst in the club's sixteen-year history. With a record of 5 wins, 16 defeats and 13 draws, the Revolution would finish at the bottom of the Eastern Conference, and second-to-last in the overall MLS table, with only expansion club Vancouver Whitecaps FC below them. The club's 1–9–7 away record was joint-worst in the league, tied with Toronto FC.

Major roster news arrived soon after the conclusion of the 2010 season. On November 3, 2010, legendary Revolution striker Taylor Twellman announced his retirement. He would conclude his career as the Revolution's top scorer, and the sixth highest scorer in MLS history with 101 goals in his 8 seasons of play. On November 15, 2010, the Revolution signed its first ever homegrown player, Diego Fagúndez, to a first team contract.

In January, the club added a pair of veteran French internationals, signing defender Didier Domi from Olympiacos F.C. and Ousmane Dabo, who had been a free agent for 7 months. The team made a joint-most five selections in the 2011 MLS SuperDraft, and used its sixth overall pick on defender A.J. Soares.

The club's first win came on March 26, 2011, a 2–0 victory over DC United that saw goals by Shalrie Joseph and Zack Schilawski.

In April, the club would further strengthen its roster with the additions of U.S. international Benny Feilhaber via allocation ranking, and the signing of journeyman Danish international striker Rajko Lekić.

Results, however, did not particularly improve. In late April 2010 standout Marko Perović would tear his ACL. He would be released in June. From May 21 to July 17 the club would go 9 games without a win. A July 20, 1–0 win over DC United would be the club's only 3 point tally in its next seven matches.

In the summer transfer window, the club added its first-ever Designated Player in Milton Caraglio, and signed Morocco international midfielder Monsef Zerka from Iraklis F.C. Perhaps emblematic of the club's 2011 struggles was a September 7 away fixture at Philadelphia Union, which marked Zerka's debut and first goal. In the match, the Revolution established a 4–1 lead in the space of 33 minutes to then ultimately draw 4–4, conceding a goal to Freddy Adu in the 55th minute and a late brace to Sébastien Le Toux, whose second goal came in the 92nd minute of stoppage time. A win the following week would be the last of the Revolution's season, and the club would close out the season with a six-game winless streak, losing five matches in a row.

The Revolution ultimately once again failed to make the playoffs in 2011, and at the end of the 2011 season, announced they had parted ways with manager Steve Nicol. Nicol had managed the team for a league-record 10 years, recording a 112–108–81 overall record, and delivering the club its first two pieces of silverware in its history.

=== Jay Heaps era (2012–2017) ===
The club announced on November 9, 2011, that Brian Bilello and Mike Burns were being promoted to the positions of club president and general manager, respectively. Six days later, on November 15, the club announced that it had hired former Revolution player (and then-acting Revolution color commentator) Jay Heaps as its new head coach. Heaps' first career victory as head coach came in the Revolution's 2012 home opener; a 1–0 win over the Portland Timbers on March 24, 2012. The Revolution's goal in that match was scored by Saër Sène, who had signed for the Revolution in the 2011-12 offseason in a free transfer from FC Bayern Munich. Sene would be the Revolution's top scorer in 2012, notching 11 goals. Also in the 2011-12 offseason, the Revolution experienced a unique transfer saga while attempting to sign Colombian international striker Jose Moreno Mora on loan from Once Caldas. The Revolution announced the signing of Moreno on February 2, 2012. Despite this announcement, on February 7, Moreno reportedly publicly stated that he had chosen to remain with Once Caldas instead of reporting to the Revolution. On the 9th, Club President Brian Bilello wrote in an article on the Revolution's website that all necessary paperwork had been filed to complete the loan deal, and that representatives from the team had been attempting to contact Moreno, but were unable to do so. Shortly thereafter, WUNR's "Deportes y Mas" host Marino Velasquev reported that the Revolution, in conjunction with MLS, had sued Moreno for breach on contract. Velasquez added on February 13 that the team was taking the case to FIFA. Moreno would report to the Revolution nearly 7 weeks later, citing visa issues and a "Personal Matter" keeping him from arriving. He scored his only goal for the franchise in a 2–1 defeat to DC United on April 14. In August of that year, after making a total of 7 appearances, Moreno was waived by the club.

The 2012 season was another disappointment, with the Revolution ultimately finishing second from bottom in the Eastern Conference and 18 points out of a playoff berth. The 2012 season also saw the departure of Shalrie Joseph, who had spent 10 years with the club and had been nominated to four league-best XI's during his tenure. In early July, the Revolution added Honduran international striker Jerry Bengtson as a Designated Player. The team would then go on a ten-game winless streak, finally snapped on September 5 thanks to Dimitry Imbongo's first MLS goal.

Despite the lack of on-field results, the rebuild started by Heaps and Burns would set the team up for success in future seasons by building a core of talented players, adding U.S. international Lee Nguyen via weighted lottery and eventual U.S. international Kelyn Rowe via the MLS Superdraft. In the 2012 offseason and during the 2013 season, the club continued to rebuild its core. The Revolution would add eventual 2013 MLS best XI defender José Gonçalves, U.S. U18 international and Revolution homegrown Scott Caldwell, U.S. internationals Juan Agudelo and Charlie Davies, and the club's first-ever 1st-overall draft pick Andrew Farrell as it restored itself as a contender.

2013

This 2013 team would finish in 3rd place in the Eastern Conference, making the playoffs for the first time since 2009, and benefitting from a breakout season by budding homegrown player, Diego Fagúndez, who grew up in Leominster, Massachusetts, and who led the team with 13 goals, adding 7 assists, during the campaign. The Revolution's season would end in the Eastern Conference semifinal round on November 6, 2013, with a 4–3 aggregate defeat to eventual MLS Cup champion Sporting Kansas City. Following the conclusion of the 2013 season, long-time Revolution keeper Matt Reis would announce his retirement. Kevin Alston would be named MLS Comeback Player of the Year in December, returning after his battle with chronic myelogenous leukemia .

In the April 2014 issue of Boston Magazine, journalist Kevin Alexander named the Kraft family as "the Worst Owners in the League" in an article that contrasted the family's sparkling reputation as NFL owners with their alleged lack of interest in MLS and the Revolution.

==== 2014 Cup run ====
Fans were optimistic entering the 2014 season. Heaps received credit for rebuilding a playoff-contending team in one season, and the Revolution returned a "young and talented" team with playoff expectations once again. Juan Agudelo would depart in January for Stoke City F.C., but the club traded for U.S. international striker Teal Bunbury in February to offset the loss.

Despite two straight losses to open the season, the Revolution would go on a 5-game winning streak throughout the month of May (their longest in nearly a decade) and found themselves in first place in the Eastern Conference entering a May 31 meeting with the Montreal Impact. A loss in that match would subsequently kick off an 8-game losing streak, tied for second longest in the club's history, and the Revolution found themselves in 6th place in the East, and out of the playoffs, as the month of July concluded.

The Revolution's fortunes would change when, via "blind draw", the club signed U.S. national team member Jermaine Jones in late August on a designated player contract. The club then went on a 10–1–1 streak led by Jones and MVP candidate Lee Nguyen to finish in 2nd place in the regular season in the Eastern Conference. The Revolution breezed through the playoffs without losing a game, defeating the Columbus Crew 7–3 on aggregate in the semi-finals, and defeating the New York Red Bulls 4–3 on aggregate in the Eastern Conference Finals. Both series featured braces from New England-born striker Charlie Davies, as well as a pair of goals from Lee Nguyen and Teal Bunbury. Both series also featured heroics from Revolution goalkeeper Bobby Shuttleworth, who led the 2014 MLS Cup Playoffs in saves with a total of 18. The victory over New York Red Bulls saw the Revolution making it to the MLS Cup Final for the first time since 2007.

On December 7, 2014, in front of a 27,000 person sell-out crowd at the StubHub Center, New England met the LA Galaxy. The occasion marked the third time the two clubs had played each other in the final, with the Galaxy besting the Revolution on the two prior occasions. The Revolution would once again lose, this time by a score of 2–1. The Revolution's lone goal was scored by Chris Tierney, a native of Wellesley, Massachusetts. This marked the club's fifth MLS Cup loss in five MLS Cup Final appearances. The 2014 season also saw the Revolution establish a "strategic partnership" with Sporting CP.

==== Decline ====
The Revolution entered the 2015 season with high expectations, and many pundits backed the club as a contender not only for the Eastern Conference Championship, but also for MLS Cup. The club continued to bolster its squad prior to the season, re-adding Juan Agudelo, a key component of the 2013 squad, who was returning from Europe. Agudelo would finish 2nd in scoring for the Revolution in 2015, behind Charlie Davies' 10 goals in his second full campaign with the club. Nevertheless, the club was unable to replicate the success of 2014, in part due to injuries limiting Jermaine Jones to just 18 appearances, and the Revolution ultimately lost in the knockout round of the 2015 MLS Cup Playoffs 2–1 to DC United, in part to a red card issued to Jones for physicality towards referee Mark Geiger. Although the Revolution were unable to match or exceed their expectations in 2015, the club would set a new record attendance for a single match, when a crowd of 42,947 turned out for the home finale on October 15 against Montreal Impact.

2016

In early 2016, the Revolution signed Xavier Kouassi as a Designated Player. The club additionally traded for Gershon Koffie, ostensibly as a replacement for Jermaine Jones, who they would trade to Colorado Rapids in March after failing to agree on a contract. Unfortunately, Kouassi would miss the entire 2016 season with a knee injury. The Revolution would trade for veteran MLS striker Kei Kamara in May in a "blockbuster" deal with Columbus Crew SC. Kamara would end the 2016 season joint-top scorer for the club, along with Juan Agudelo. The Revolution were competitive for the majority of the 2016 season, but would ultimately narrowly miss out on the playoff berth based on goal differential. Highlights from the 2016 season included Andrew Farrell being chosen as an MLS all star, and the team making a run in the 2016 U.S. Open Cup; ultimately reaching the 2016 U.S. Open Cup final, but falling 4–2 to FC Dallas. The regular season concluded with a 3–0 home victory over Montreal Impact in front of 39,587 fans. That attendance figure then-marked the second-highest home attendance figure for a Revolution regular season game, behind the 2015 regular season finale, and ahead of the 2007 August LA Galaxy match. It would also help boost the Revolution's overall average home attendance figure to 20,201, a new club record.

2017

The 2017 season brought a close to the Jay Heaps era in New England. The club would once again finish one spot outside of a playoff berth. Despite a stellar 12–2–3 home record, the team went a dismal 1–13–3 on the road. The Revolution would attempt to strengthen the roster in the summer transfer window, adding center back Claude Dielna as a designated player and trading $200,000 in Targeted Allocation Money, $200,000 in General Allocation Money and an international roster spot to Columbus for striker Krisztián Németh.

On September 13, 2017, New England suffered a record-breaking 7–0 defeat away to Atlanta United FC. The 7 goal margin of defeat tied the MLS record for largest margin of victory, and the Revolution became the first club in MLS history to not record a single shot in a match. On September 18, two days after a disappointing 3–1 loss to Sporting Kansas City, the Revolution announced it had parted ways with head coach Jay Heaps, and that Tom Soehn would be serving as interim for the remainder of the season. During his six seasons in charge of the Revolution, Heaps recorded a 75W-81L-43D record, leading the club to three successive MLS playoffs, an MLS Cup Final, and a U.S. Open Cup Final.

=== Brad Friedel era (2018–2019) ===
In November 2017 the Revolution announced that the former United States men's national team goalkeeper, and former U.S. U-19 coach Brad Friedel would be the club's next head coach. Entering the 2018 season excitement surrounding the club's ability to compete was tempered, as it was understood that with a new head coach came a change in philosophy which would take time to implement. Many analysts predicted the club would miss the playoffs entirely.

In the 2018 pre-season, the Revolution traded Kei Kamara to Vancouver Whitecaps FC in exchange for a 2019 first-round draft pick, and a conditional 2020 second-round pick. On loan from C.F. Pachuca, the team brought in Ecuadorian striker Cristian Penilla. Citing frustration over his contract (he was at the time the seventh-highest paid player on the team, making $500,000, despite ranking fifth in the league in over-all goals over the previous four seasons), Lee Nguyen reportedly demanded a trade at the end of the 2017 season on three separate occasions. The dispute would ultimately lead to his sitting-out the team's 2018 pre-season training camp. Nguyen would ultimately be traded to Los Angeles FC on May 1, 2018, in exchange for $350,000 in General Allocation Money and $350,000 in Targeted Allocation Money. The Revolution started their 2018 campaign strongly, and on March 10, 2018, Friedel's Revolution won its first game, 2–1 over the Colorado Rapids. Entering July, and the midpoint of the season, the Revolution were on a six-match unbeaten run, and sporting an impressive record of 7–4–6, six points above the playoff line, and earning their highest point total since the MLS moved to 34 games in 2011, and the most they'd had through 17 games since 2008. Their unbeaten run would end at 7 matches on July 14, when a 93rd minute Chris Pontius goal gave the LA Galaxy a 3–2 victory. That match was notable as the Revolution saw season-high attendance of 36,573, the largest crowd in 2 years. Offensively, Teal Bunbury recorded 10 goals in the season's first 17 matches. Defensively, goalkeeper Matt Turner experienced breakout success, starting all four of New England's matches to open the season while recording a 1.25 goals against average and 16 saves, and, on March 31, 2018, he recording his first MLS clean sheet in the club's 2–0 win at BBVA Compass Stadium against Houston Dynamo FC. This was an impressive milestone, given that Turner was the first Revolution keeper to record a clean sheet since August 24, 2016. Cristian Penilla additionally had a very strong 2018 campaign, earning the nickname "The Ecuadorian DeLorean", and ultimately contributing 12 goals and 7 assists, for which he was named JetBlue Team MVP, Players' Player of the Year, and won the club's Golden Boot Award, in addition to being named Midnight Riders Man of the Year.

The team's form dropped off considerably during the second half of the season. Following a 3–2 win over DC United in match week 17, the Revolution would only record three more wins on the season, losing nine and drawing five. During the months of July and August, the team would not win a single game, taking only 2 points from 8 matches. The team would ultimately finish in 8th place in the eastern conference, 9 points out of a playoff spot.

=== Bruce Arena era (2019–2023) ===
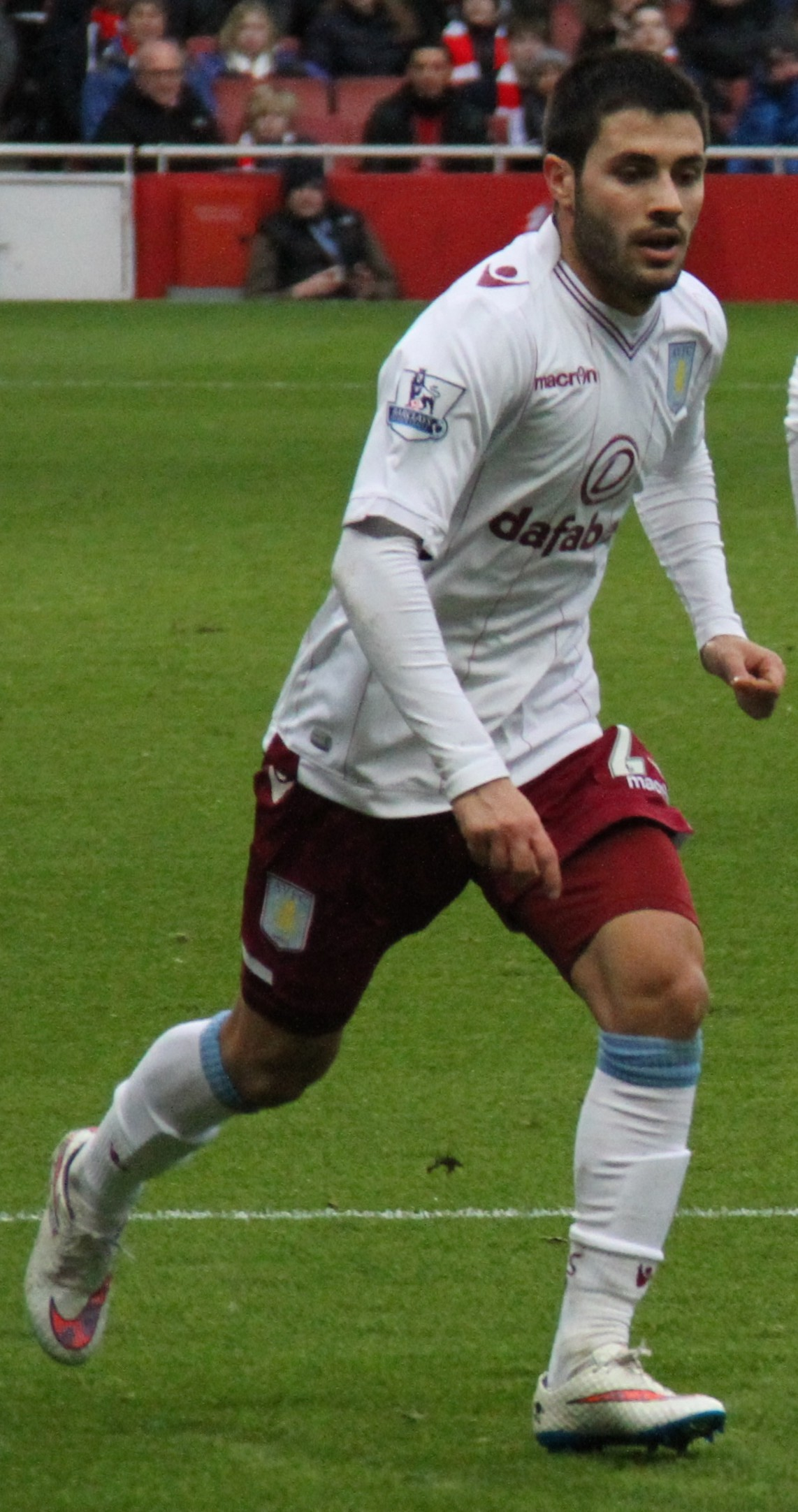
Carles Gil was named MLS MVP in 2021.

Despite adding eventual MLS 2019 Newcomer of the Year Carles Gil and 1st-round draft pick Tajon Buchanan in the 2019 pre-season, the former for a then-club record fee of $2 million, the 2019 season opened poorly. Exiting match week 12, which featured a 6–0 loss to the Chicago Fire, the Revolution had earned only 8 points on the season, and had conceded 18 goals in their last four matches.

On May 9, 2019, coach Brad Friedel was fired by the Revolution after a 12–21–13 career record and a 2–8–2 record to open the 2019 season. Four days later on May 13, the Revolution announced the dismissal of General Manager Mike Burns. The following day, the club announced that former D.C. United, LA Galaxy and USMNT coach Bruce Arena would serve as both head coach and sporting director. Under Arena, the Revolution, who were at that point in last place in the Eastern Conference, went eleven games undefeated until losing 2–0 to the Los Angeles FC on August 3, 2019. Following that defeat, the Revolution closed out the season only losing two more matches on a 2-2-6 run, and qualifying for the playoffs for the first time since 2015. The summer transfer window marked the arrival of Arena's first Revolution signing, Argentine striker Gustavo Bou, for a club-record fee reportedly in the range of $6–7 million, from Club Tijuana. Bou played a crucial role in the second half of the 2019 season, making 14 appearances, scoring 9 goals, and adding two assists.

After concluding the 2019 regular season with a 3–1 loss to Atlanta United FC, The Revolution would be eliminated in the 1st Round of the 2019 Playoffs by Atlanta United FC, getting shut out 1–0.

2020

Arena's Revolution entered the 2020 season as presumed playoff contenders. Pre-season, Arena strengthened the squad, adding Polish striker Adam Buksa for $4.5m as a Designated Player, and former Manchester United defender Alexander Büttner. Though the Revolution were beginning a season with three Designated Players for the first time in their history, results in the COVID-19-shortened 23 match season were inconsistent, with the club losing Carles Gil to an Achilles injury for all but 6 matches, the team struggled to create chances, and additionally struggled to hold on to leads, winning just two matches at home.

When play was suspended in early March due to the COVID-19 pandemic, the Revolution were winless on the season. The club recorded the first win of its campaign in the MLS is Back Tournament group stage, where it ultimately finished 2nd and advanced to the round of 16, losing to Philadelphia Union 1–0 on a 63rd-minute goal from Sérgio Santos.

The Revolution were able to leave their 2020 regular season inconsistencies behind them as they entered the 2020 MLS Cup Playoffs. Fielding all three of their Designated Players, the Revolution defeated the Montreal Impact 2–1 in the tournament's play in round, thanks to a 38th-minute goal from Carles Gil and a 2nd half goal by Gustavo Bou 5 minutes into stoppage time. Four days later, the Revolution would travel to Subaru Park to play the Supporter's Shield-holding, first-playoff-seeded, Philadelphia Union. Behind goals from Adam Buksa and Tajon Buchanan, the Revolution would advance 2–0 to the Eastern Conference semi finals, where they would go on the road to play Orlando City SC. The win over Philadelphia marked the third time in franchise history in which the Revolution had defeated the top seed in the playoffs. It was additionally their first victory over Philadelphia in 6 matches. A brace from Gustavo Bou, a 17th-minute penalty from Carles Gil, and a penalty save from Matt Turner against Nani would see New England past Orlando and into the Eastern Conference Finals for the first time in 7 years. Matt Turner, who would finish second in MLS Goalkeeper of the Year voting for 2020, made six saves in the Eastern Conference Final, but a 59th-minute goal from Artur would prove enough to knock the Revolution out of the playoffs, and they would ultimately lose 1–0 to the Columbus Crew, who would eventually win the MLS Cup 2020.

==== 2021: Supporters' Shield winners ====
The 2021 season saw the Revolution win their first Supporters' Shield in club history by having the best record in the regular season. New England set a new MLS record for points in a season (73), surpassing the previous mark of 72 set by Los Angeles FC in 2019. Goalkeeper Matt Turner won the MLS Goalkeeper of the Year Award, becoming the first Revolution player to ever win the award. Over his 28 starts, he recorded a 1.25 goals-against average, a 73.2 save percentage, and five shutouts. Tajon Buchanan, Carles Gil, Gustavo Bou, and Turner were all named to the 2021 MLS All-Star roster. Turner was named 2021 MLS All-Star Game MVP after making two penalty saves against the Liga MX All stars on August 25, 2021. He also set a club record with 17 regular season wins, which was tied for the most in the league. Carles Gil won the MLS Most Valuable Player Award, in addition to leading the league in assists, with 18, and winning the MLS Comeback Player of the Year Award. Adam Buksa concluded his 2021 regular season with 16 goals, making him the 5th highest scorer in the 2021 MLS season. Gustavo Bou finished as the 9th highest scorer in the league with 15 goals and 9 assists.

As they'd finished in first place, the Revolution received a first round bye in the 2021 MLS Cup Playoffs. This bye, coinciding with an international break, meant the Revolution had a 23-day layoff between their final regular season game and their first playoff game. In that match, an Eastern Conference Semifinal matchup against New York City FC, the Revolution would lose in penalties to the club that would become the eventual 2021 MLS Cup champion ending their hopes to be the first MLS team to complete the league double (winning both the Supporters' Shield and MLS Cup) since 2017.

The franchise's turnaround since May 2019 has been credited to head coach and sporting director Bruce Arena.

==== 2022: Arena's departure ====
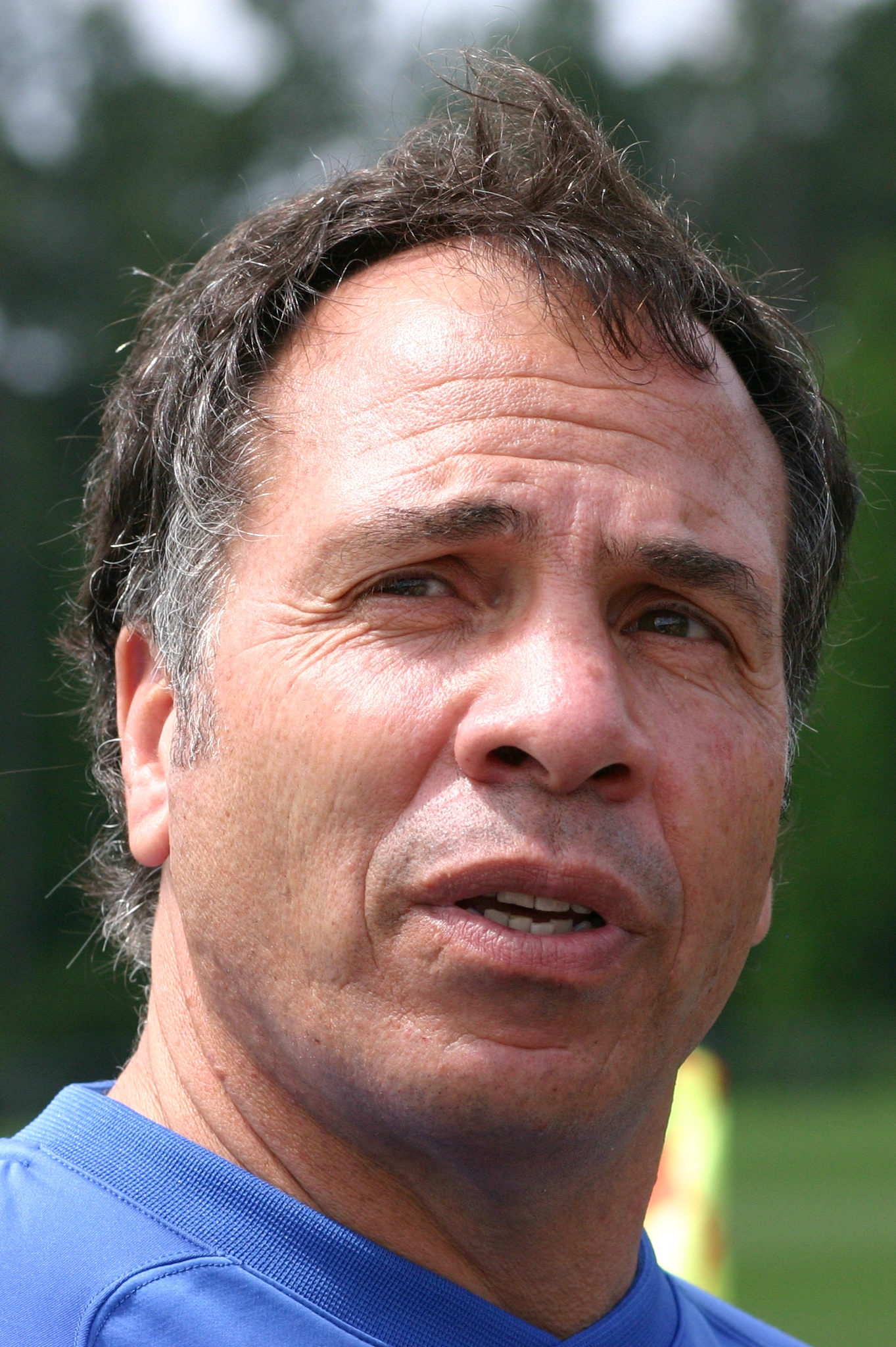
Bruce Arena, New England's head coach and sporting director 2019–2023

As well as the 2021 offseason departure of Tajon Buchannan, the 2022 season saw the departure of key players Matt Turner and Adam Buksa, and the Revolution were unable to repeat the success of their 2021 campaign, finishing the season 10th place in the Eastern Conference with a 10–10–12 record, and losing in the quarterfinals of the 2022 CONCACAF Champions League to Pumas UNAM despite winning the first leg of the tie 3–0.

2023

The club would return to form in 2023, buoyed by the play of Đorđe Petrović, who would be sold to Chelsea F.C. in August for a reported £12.5 million, plus £1.5 million in add-ons.

On August 1, 2023, with the club in sole possession of 2nd place in the Eastern Conference, The Revolution released a statement that Bruce Arena had been suspended due to "reports of inappropriate and insensitive remarks." On September 9, 2023, the Bruce Arena era would end after Arena's resignation following a six-week investigation. In a club statement, The Revolution announced that Richie Williams would continue to serve as interim coach until the end of the 2023 season, with Curt Onalfo continuing to serve as interim Sporting Director. Three days later on September 12, the team announced that Clint Peay would be replacing Williams as interim manager. Assistant coaches Shalrie Joseph and Dave van den Bergh were additionally released by the club. During Peay's tenure the Revolution would finish out the regular season with 2 wins, 1 draw, and 4 defeats, finishing 5th in the Eastern Conference and dropping both matches in the first round of the 2023 MLS Cup Playoffs to the Philadelphia Union 3–1 and 1–0. Although on-field results suffered after Arena's suspension, fan support remained strong. The attendance for the regular season finale, a 2–1 win over the Philadelphia Union, was 41,355. That figure marked the second-highest ever for a regular-season Revolution match, and the third-highest figure in single-match Revolution attendance history (behind the 2002 MLS Cup and the 2015 final regular season match). It would also help bump the single-season average home attendance for the Revolution to 23,940, marking a new club record.

=== Caleb Porter era (2024–2025) ===
The club elevated Curt Onalfo from interim to full time Sporting Director on November 30, 2023, and on December 19, 2023, announced that it had appointed Caleb Porter as its new head coach. Entering the 2024 season, pundits believed the Revolution would be a playoff contender. Porter would add three players in the offseason; acquiring defenders Nick Lima and Jonathan Mensah as well as goalkeeper Henrich Ravas. These additions would join Designated Player Tomás Chancalay, who the Revolution purchased for $3.1m in November following his loan to the club in the 2023 Summer Transfer Window. The 2023-24 offseason also saw the departure of Gustavo Bou, who would conclude his Revolution career with 48 goals and 21 assists in 108 league appearances over four seasons. The first win of the Porter era came on February 21, 2024, a 1–0 victory over C.A. Independiente de La Chorrera in the 2024 CONCACAF Champions Cup. The first league win came on April 6, a 1–0 home win against Charlotte FC. Three days later, the Revolution were eliminated from the Concacaf Champions Cup in the quarterfinals, losing 9–2 on aggregate to Club América. On April 27, in their match against Inter Miami CF and Lionel Messi, the Revolution set a new single-match attendance record of 65,612, beating the record set at the 2002 MLS Cup Final. The club concluded the 2024 season with an average attendance of 29,262, a club record high. On-field results were not a positive, as the club recorded the worst goal differential in the league (tied with San Jose), scored the fewest goals of any club in the league, and conceded the second-most goals of any club in the league. Following a four-game winning streak in June, the Revolution managed to win only three more matches in the second half of the season, and were eliminated from post-season contention on October 5 with three matches left to play. The Revolution's final match of the season gave them a chance to defend their 2021 single-season points record, which was being challenged by their opponent, Inter Miami. Miami would break the record with a win over the Revolution. The Revs jumped out to a 2–0 lead, but conceded six straight unanswered goals, losing 6–2 and allowing Miami to set a new points record. In 2024, the Revolution would end up tying a club record for losses in a single season, with 21.

The Revolution announced on September 15, 2025, that they had parted ways with Caleb Porter. Assistant coach Pablo Moreira took over as interim head coach for the team's remaining 4 games. Porter concluded his Revolution tenure with a record of 23W-39L-13D across all competitions.

== Team colors and crest ==
1996–2021

The original club badge was stylized and based on the flag of the United States with the canton stylized as a soccer ball (similar to Adidas' ball for the UEFA Champions League), composed of six stars representing the six states of New England (Connecticut, Maine, Massachusetts, New Hampshire, Rhode Island, and Vermont). The overall design mirrored the 1994 FIFA World Cup logo. The Revolution was the last founding team of the MLS to keep its original crest. In 2014, the flag and ball were retained while the name was dropped.

In 2021, the club launched its new logo. They enlisted an independent third-party to conduct focus groups consisting of Boston sports fans to elicit feedback about what the re-branded badge should represent. It features an "R" sitting above a red strikethrough. The inner shape references traditional flag drapery which plays homage to the original Revolution logo. The "R"'s font references the Boston Tea Party mark and American Revolutionary era lettering. Red details around the logo itself are reminiscent of patriotic bunting and the strikethrough behind the logo is meant to symbolize defiance.

=== Uniforms ===
Traditionally, the Revolution have worn all-navy at home, with the exception of red shorts during the club's first year in 1996. From 2014 to 2020, the club wore white shorts at home. To mark the club and the league's 25th anniversary, the red shorts returned for the 2020 and 2021 seasons. The Revolution wore white secondary uniforms for their entire existence until 2015; that year club introduced a red away jersey with white and green accents in tribute to the flag of New England, and away uniforms demonstrated more design variation from there. The following is a partial list of kits worn by the Revolution.

- Home

2005	2006–2007	2008–2009	2010–2011	2012–2013	2014–2015

2016–2017	2018–2019	2020–2021	2022–2023	2024–

- Away

2002	2004	2005 (Note: Despite the similar appearance, the 2004 kit was manufactured by Reebok, and the 2005 kit was manufactured by Adidas.)	2006–2007	2008–2009	2010–2011

2012–2014	2015–2016	2017–2018	2019–2020	2021–2022	2023-2024	2025-

=== Sponsorship ===
Period	Kit manufacturer	Shirt sponsor	Sleeve sponsor
1996–1999	Reebok	—	
2000	Atletica	—	
2001–2003	Umbro	—	
2004	Reebok	—	
2005–2011	Adidas	—	
2012–2024	Adidas	UnitedHealth Group#UnitedHealthcare	—
2025–present	Adidas	Gillette	—

== Stadium ==
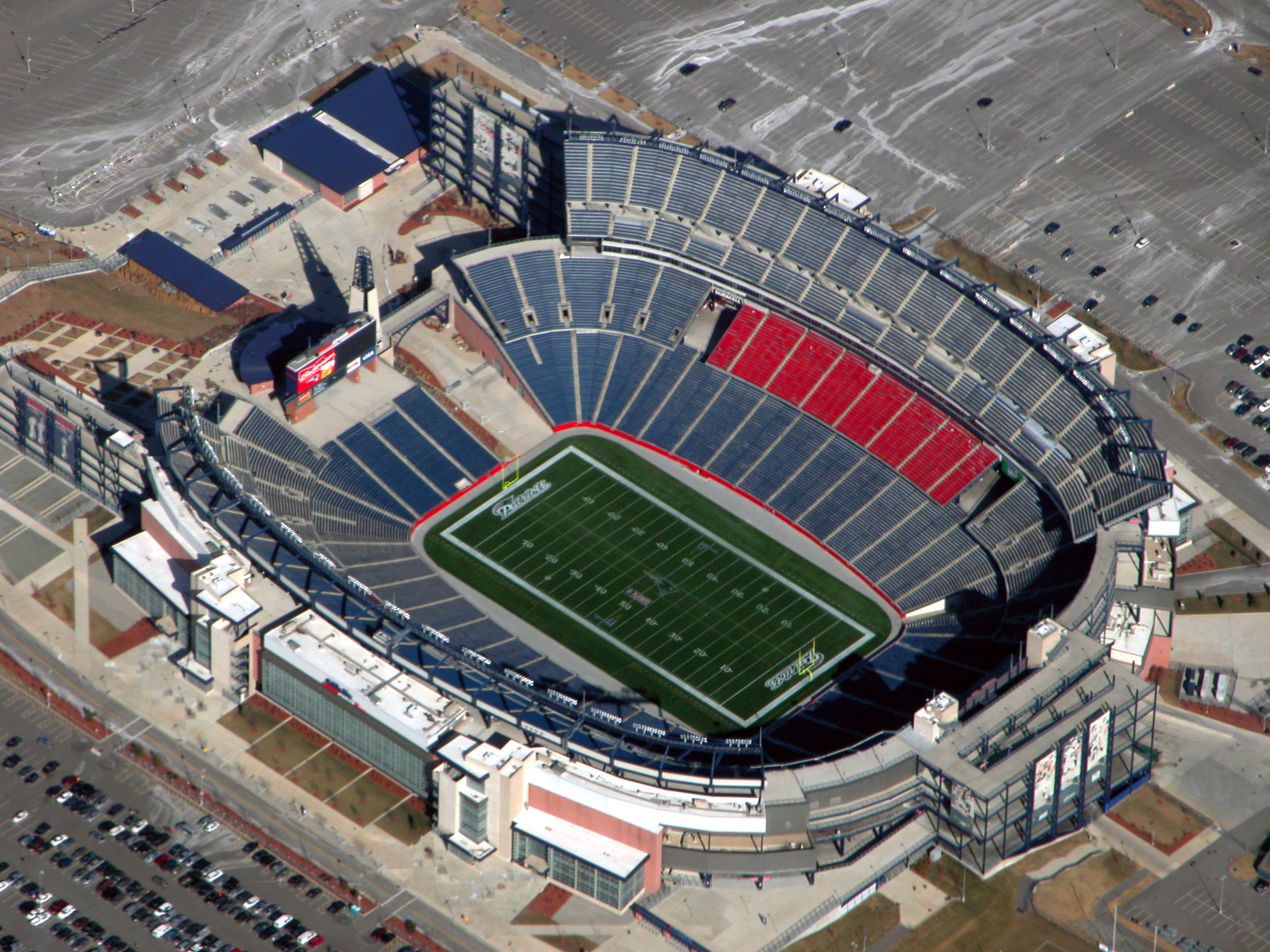
Gillette Stadium has been New England Revolution's home stadium since 2002

The Revolution play home matches at Gillette Stadium in Foxborough, Massachusetts. At its inception, the Revolution played their games at Foxboro Stadium, alongside the American football team New England Patriots of the National Football League (NFL). In 2002, Robert Kraft financed a $350-million project as a replacement for Foxboro Stadium which would come to be known as Gillette Stadium. In 2007, Kraft began to develop the land around Gillette Stadium, creating a $375-million open-air shopping and entertainment center called Patriot Place.

Gillette Stadium is a 66,000-seat stadium including luxury and box seating. The Revolution artificially limit the stadium's capacity for MLS matches, with certain seating sections covered with tarpaulins, or made inaccessible. However, the club does open the entire stadium for international matches and MLS Playoffs. On October 20, 2002, during the 2002 MLS Cup final a record was established when a crowd of 61,316 attended a Revolution 1–0 loss against the Los Angeles Galaxy. This was the largest stand-alone MLS post-season crowd on record until the 2018 MLS Cup in Atlanta at Mercedes-Benz Stadium.

Although the Revolution have played on natural grass from 2002 to 2006, they currently play on FieldTurf which was upgraded in April 2014 to FieldTurf "Revolution" with "VersaTile" drainage system. Gillete Stadium's FieldTurf surface was certified by FIFA with a two-star quality rating, the highest possible rating. Kraft, however, announced that he would be willing to switch the stadium to a natural grass playing field as part of his stadium bid for 2026 FIFA World Cup.

Kraft opened a new $35 million training center in 2019. The team's training facilities and offices are located in the wetlands behind Gillette Stadium. Despite these new facilities, Kraft claimed that he was still committed to building a new soccer-specific stadium closer to the city limits of Boston.

=== Plans for a soccer-specific stadium ===
On June 14, 2006, Major League Soccer announced via press release that the MLS Commissioner's Office would begin working with the Kraft Family to identify sites on which a soccer-specific stadium for the Revolution could be built.

On August 2, 2007, The Boston Herald reported that the city of Somerville and Revolution officials had held preliminary discussions about building a 50,000 to 55,000-seat stadium on a 100-acre (0.40 km^{2}) site off of Innerbelt Road near Interstate 93 In the Inner Belt / Brickbottom area. The stadium could cost anywhere between $50 and $200 million based on other similar MLS soccer-specific stadiums.

Additionally in 2007, then-Boston mayor Tom Menino wrote to MLS suggesting Roxbury, Boston's "Parcel 3", across from Boston Police Headquarters, be considered as a spot for a Revolution stadium. However, according to a 2007 Boston Globe editorial, the task force promised to investigate the site was never formed.

In a July 2010 interview, Kraft said that over $1 million had been invested in finding a suitable site, preferably in the urban core.

After a two-year hiatus, the Revolution renewed their plans to build a stadium in Somerville since the Massachusetts Bay Transportation Authority finalized its Green Line maintenance facility plans. The team was this time focused on Assembly Row, and Somerville mayor Joseph Curtatone confirmed to the Somerville Journal that he'd been in contact with the team for months regarding the site.

In 2012, Revere mayor Dan Rizzo expressed an interest in the Revolution building a stadium in Revere. The Boston Globe reported on October 1, 2012, that the Revolution had held talks with the mayor regarding building a stadium at the Wonderland Greyhound Park property if the city was able to acquire it as part of casino negotiations surrounding Suffolk Downs. Revere eventually lost the casino bid to Everett.

On October 16, 2012, Fall River, Massachusetts, mayor William Flanagan wrote a letter to Kraft pitching Fall River as a potential site for a Revolution, focusing on the city's "strong soccer culture", Flanagan invited Kraft to take a tour. Revolution spokesman Jeff Cournoyer stated to The Enterprise regarding the proposal that "there has been significant interest and we've been contacted by several communities. We will continue to vet all opportunities."

On July 1, 2014, WPRI-TV reported that then-Providence mayor Angel Taveras confirmed that the city had preliminary discussions with officials from the Revolution surrounding a stadium, and that then-Central Falls mayor James Diossa had spoken to president Brian Bilello about a move to Central Falls.

On November 18, 2014, The Boston Globe reported that the Kraft family had met with city and state officials over a stadium in South Boston on a public lot off Interstate 93 on Frontage Road near Widett Circle. The proposed site is adjacent to an industrial site that has been identified for the main Olympic stadium by the organizing group for Boston's now-failed bid to host the 2024 Summer Olympics, of which Robert Kraft was a member.

On April 28, 2017, Associated Press reported that talks between the Kraft Group and University of Massachusetts Boston over a proposed stadium location in Dorchester, Boston at South Boston's Bayside Expo Center had ended. Talks had been ongoing since June 2016, but politicians were concerned over the rise in traffic a stadium would bring.

In 2019, The Providence Journal reported that 2017 conversations between Jonathan Kraft and then-Rhode Island governor Gina Raimondo led to Rhode Island's Commerce Corporation assigning Boston design firm Utile to find suitable spots for a Revolution stadium in Rhode Island. The group ultimately identified The "Tockwotton" waterfront in East Providence, Rhode Island, The Port of Providence waterfront off Allens Avenue, The "Tidewater" property on the Seekonk River in Pawtucket, and The Apex building site near Slater Mill Historic Site as suitable.

On March 17, 2022, Boston.com reported that the Revolution may be interested in building a stadium at the site of the old Mystic Generating Station in Everett, Massachusetts, next to Encore Boston Harbor casino, after its acquisition by Wynn Resorts. On July 15, 2022, The Boston Globe reported that the Massachusetts House of Representatives had passed legislation that could potentially allow the Revolution to build a stadium on said property by exempting the 43-acre parcel of land from environmental requirements. The Boston Globe reported on August 1, 2022, that the bill containing this legislation did not pass.

On November 14, 2023, it was announced that language removing 43.11 acres of land on Alford Street in Everett, Massachusetts from the Mystic River designated port area "for the purpose of converting the parcel into a professional soccer stadium and a waterfront park" had been included in a supplemental budget released by the Massachusetts Senate the previous day. Though the wording was removed from the final Supplemental Budget, state senator Sal DiDomenico would introduce a bill with the same intent on December 21, 2023. On April 2, 2024, a public hearing was held with the Massachusetts Legislature's Joint Committee on Economic Development and Emerging Technologies and New England Revolution officials to discuss the stadium plans. Renderings of the potential stadium were presented by the team. At the end of the formal session in 2024, the measure died due to lack of House-Senate agreement on a broader economic development bill (the House version of which did not include the stadium provision).

On November 12, 2024, Massachusetts legislature announced that a provision stipulating the removal of the Everett 43-acre parcel of land's "Designated Port Area" distinction had been included in the economic development bond bill.

On December 31, 2025, the Kraft Group announced formal agreements with the cities of Everett and Boston to construct a soccer-specific stadium for the New England Revolution on the site of a decommissioned power plant along the Mystic River. The project involves the demolition of existing industrial structures and significant environmental remediation to transform the long-vacant waterfront property. To support the new venue, the agreement includes millions of dollars in infrastructure investments aimed at traffic mitigation, enhanced public transit access, and the creation of a public waterfront park connecting Everett with Boston's Charlestown neighborhood, marking the most definitive step toward moving the club out of Gillette Stadium since its founding.

== Player development ==
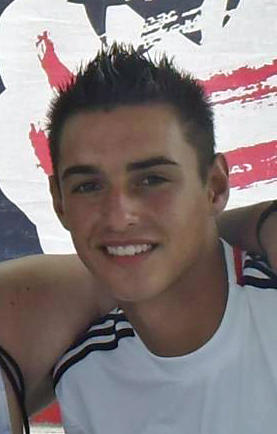
Diego Fagúndez (of Leominster, Massachusetts) signed the first homegrown contract with the club in 2010

=== Reserves ===
On October 9, 2019, the club announced the formation of a reserve team, New England Revolution II, in USL League One that would begin play in the 2020 season and that they would play at Gillette Stadium in Foxborough. On November 25, 2019, the club announced its first manager, Clint Peay.

The club announced on December 6, 2021, that it was joining the inaugural 21-team MLS Next Pro season starting in 2022.

=== Academy system ===
The New England Revolution Academy is an elite youth development program fully-funded by the senior club and recognized by U.S. Soccer as one of the top 10 youth development programs in the country. Competing in MLS Next, a successor to the U.S. Soccer Development Academy, the Revolution Academy provides local players throughout Greater Boston and beyond (regardless of their financial situation) a pathway to a professional career.

All Revolution youth team home matches are played at Gillette Stadium. However, due to scheduling conflicts, some home matches in the past have been hosted at the B.M.C. Durfee High School in Fall River, Massachusetts, and the Fruit Street Fields (located in Hopkinton, Massachusetts).

Since 2010 when Diego Fagúndez became the Revolution's first ever MLS Homegrown Player Rule signing, the Revolution have promoted several other youth prospects from their academy team, including Scott Caldwell, Zachary Herivaux, Justin Rennicks, Noel Buck, Esmir Bajraktarević, and Damian Rivera. Most recently, the Revolution have signed many new academy players to professional contracts. Eric Klein, Damario McIntosh, Cristiano Olivera, Javaun Mussenden, and most notably Peyton Miller.

On January 2, 2025, New England Revolution sold academy prospect Esmir Bajraktarevic to Dutch club PSV Eindhoven in a deal reportedly worth up to $6 million.

== Club culture ==
=== Supporters ===
Revolution fans often fly the New England pine flag at matches. The flag has also been incorporated into the club's kit.

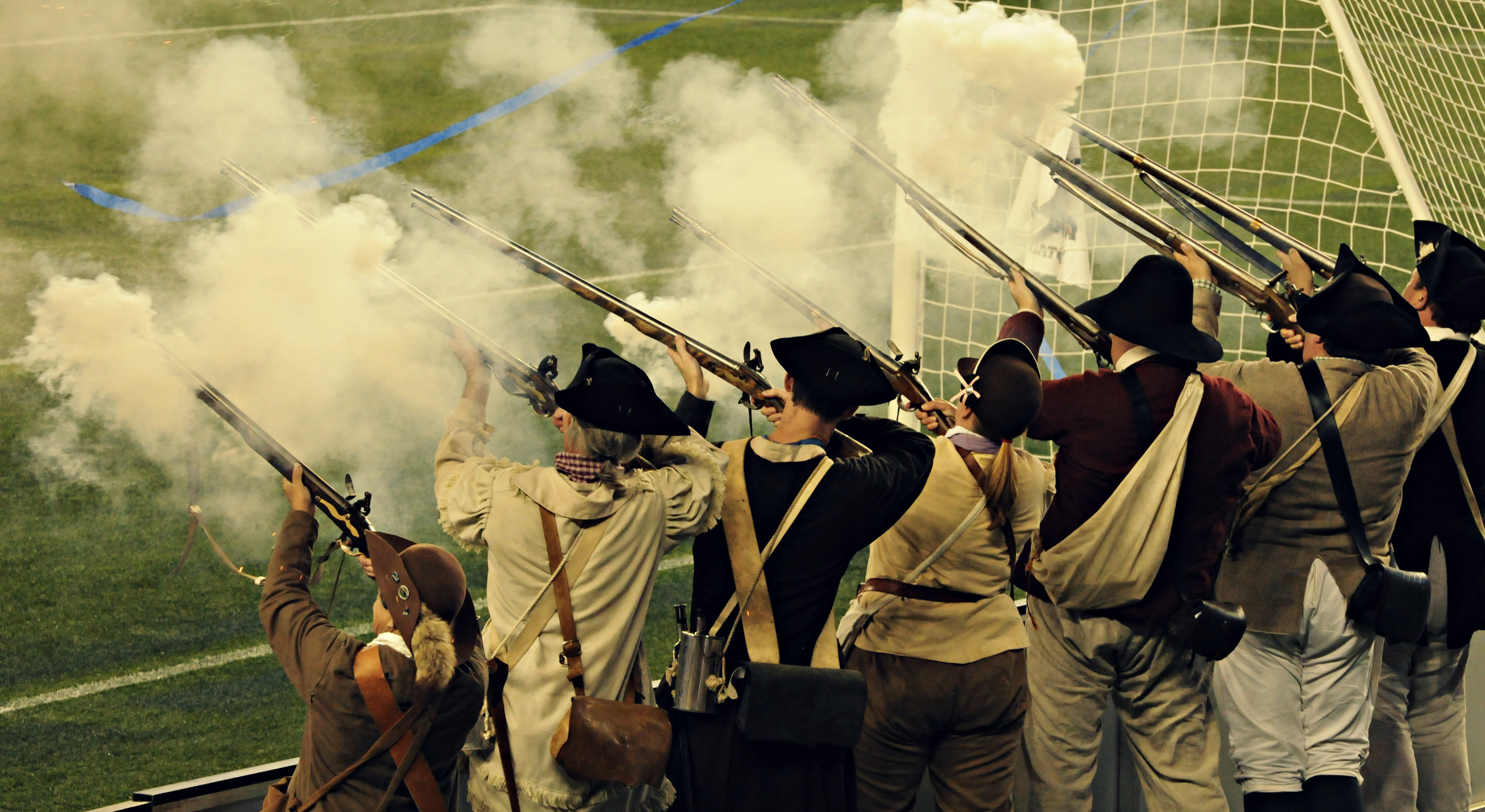
The End Zone Militia firing flintlock muskets following a New England goal during a match against Chicago in 2013.

A New England Revolution tifo in 2026

The team's supporter's clubs are called the "Midnight Riders" and "The Rebellion". The name 'Midnight Riders' is in honor of the famous rides of Paul Revere and William Dawes, who announced the departure of British troops from Boston to Concord at the beginning of the American Revolution. The two groups together occupy the north stand of the stadium, which they have nicknamed "The Fort". The Fort is a general admission section and draws its name from the revolutionary theme which runs through the team supporters. In the same theme, the Revolution also employ a corps known as the End Zone Militia, a group of American Revolutionary War reenactors founded in 1996 by Geoff Campbell, a reenactor for the 9th Massachusetts Regiment (26th Continental Regiment), also employed by the Patriots at the same venue. The reenactors wear authentic 18th century clothing including the iconic colonial tricorn hat, and carry flintlock black gunpowder muskets which are ceremoniously fired when the Revolution score a goal.

=== Rivalries ===
The club's main rival is widely considered to be New York Red Bulls, due to the rivalry stemming from other Boston–New York rivalries in other professional sports such as the Knicks–Celtics rivalry in the NBA, the Jets–Patriots rivalry in the NFL and the Yankees-Red Sox rivalry in MLB. Beginning in 2002, the Revs had a 20 match undefeated streak against the Red Bulls for games at Gillette Stadium. This streak helped to intensify the rivalry between the teams. The streak came to an end on June 8, 2014, as the Red Bulls won 2–0 at Gillette Stadium.

The Revolution have also built rivalries with fellow Eastern Conference teams D.C. United and Chicago Fire. These teams have faced each other on numerous occasions in the playoffs. In a 2009 poll on the club's official site, New England fans considered the Chicago Fire the Revs' most bitter rival as the clubs have clashed many times in the MLS playoffs and regular season.

Since 2015 a rivalry has also developed with newcomer club New York City FC, due to the latter club's association with the Yankees and with Yankee Stadium being the club's incumbent home ground. To further fuel this rivalry, New York City FC knocked out the Revolution in the eastern conference semifinals of the 2021 MLS Cup Playoffs in a 2–2 tie that eventually went to penalties, despite the Revolution having the superior regular season record that year.

== Broadcasting ==
From 2021 to 2022, all Revolution matches were televised locally in high definition on either WBZ-TV or WSBK-TV; nationally televised matches aired on ESPN, Fox Sports, and Univision. All matches are broadcast on radio by 98.5 The Sports Hub, but this is a simulcast of the TV feed. Brad Feldman served as the team's longtime play-by-play on both TV and radio, with former Revolution and USMNT player Charlie Davies doing color commentary. Prior to 2021, matches were aired locally on NBC Sports Boston.

In 2023, MLS partnered with Apple to launch MLS Season Pass, which would broadcast every regular and postseason MLS game for the 2023 season. As of the 2023 season, Revolution games are broadcast almost exclusively on this service, with exceptions for certain national linear television broadcast partners.

== Players ==
=== Roster ===
As of October 9, 2026

Note: Flags indicate national team as defined under FIFA eligibility rules; some limited exceptions apply. Players may hold more than one non-FIFA nationality.

No.	Pos.	Nation	Player
2	DF	MLI	Mamadou Fofana
4	DF	USA	Tanner Beason
6	DF	RSA	Tylon Smith (on loan from Queens Park Rangers)
7	FW	USA	Griffin Yow
8	MF	USA	Matt Polster
9	FW	ECU	Leonardo Campana
10	MF	ESP	Carles Gil (captain)
11	FW	ENG	Jack Harrison
12	DF	ISR	Ilay Feingold
14	MF	USA	Jackson Yueill
15	DF	USA	Cody Baker (on loan from Seattle Sounders)
16	FW	HUN	Dániel Gazdag
17	FW	USA	Marcos Zambrano
19	DF	USA	Damario McIntosh
21	MF	USA	Brooklyn Raines

No.	Pos.	Nation	Player
22	DF	USA	Ethan Kohler
23	DF	USA	Will Sands
25	DF	USA	Peyton Miller
27	FW	USA	Wilson Harris
30	GK	USA	Matt Turner (on loan from Lyon)
33	GK	USA	Donovan Parisian
35	MF	USA	Cristiano Oliveira
41	FW	ARG	Luca Langoni
65	MF	USA	Judah Siqueira
66	DF	USA	Joshua Wynder (on loan from Benfica)
73	GK	PAN	JD Gunn
77	MF	URU	Diego Fagúndez
80	MF	NGR	Alhassan Yusuf
88	DF	USA	Andrew Farrell
99	FW	ISR	Dor Turgeman

=== Out on loan ===
Note: Flags indicate national team as defined under FIFA eligibility rules; some limited exceptions apply. Players may hold more than one non-FIFA nationality.

No.	Pos.	Nation	Player
18	MF	UGA	Allan Oyirwoth (on loan to Dunfermline Athletic)
32	FW	USA	Malcolm Fry (on loan to Lexington SC)
38	MF	USA	Eric Klein (on loan to Rhode Island FC)

No.	Pos.	Nation	Player
43	DF	USA	Tiago Suarez (on loan to San Antonio FC)
—	MF	USA	Jack Panayotou (on loan to Loudoun United)

== Team management ==
=== Head coaches ===
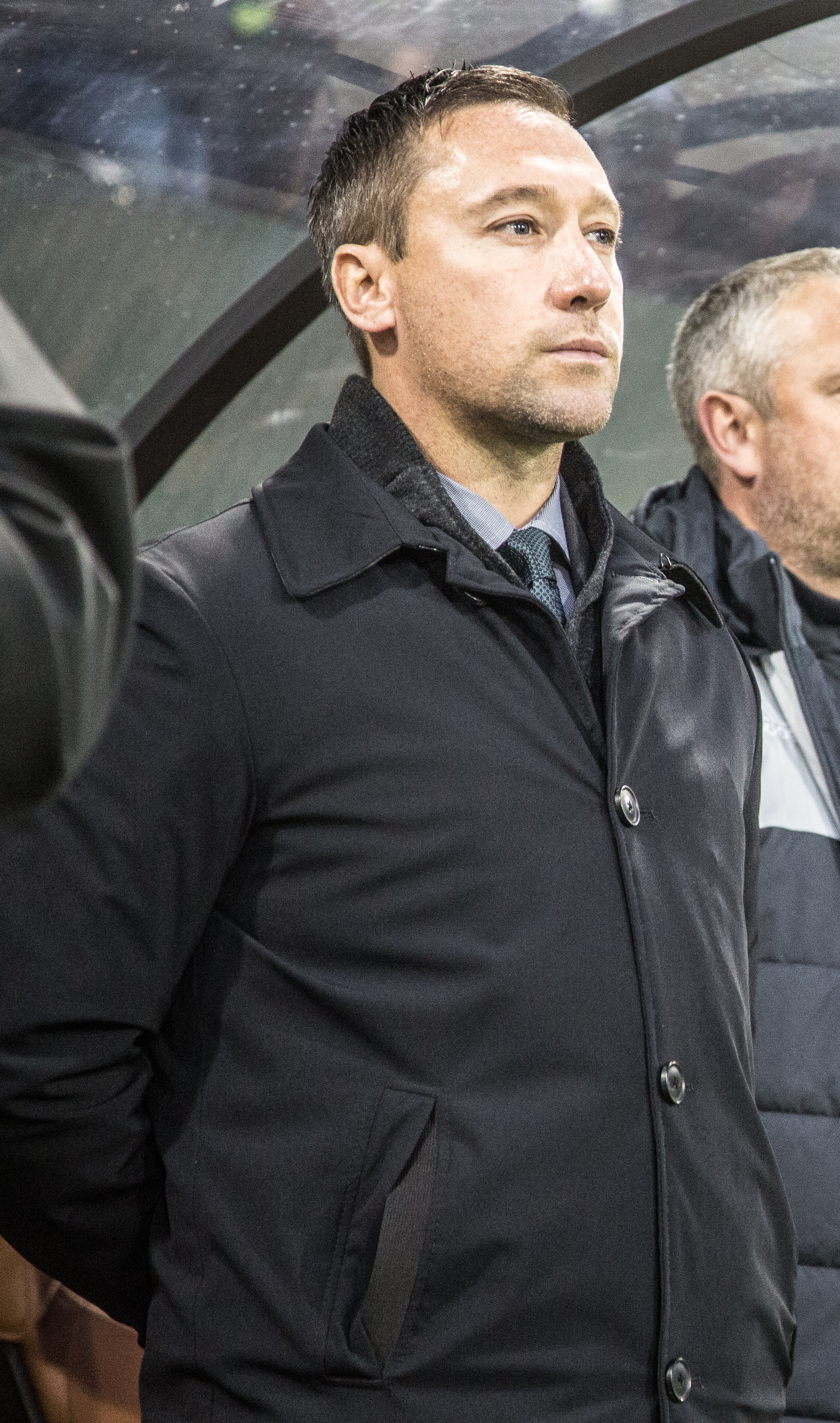
Caleb Porter, New England's head coach from 2023 to 2025

The most recent head coach was Caleb Porter, who was announced on December 19, 2023, and dismissed on September 15, 2025. Porter took over after a months-long vacancy in the head coaching position, which had been temporarily filled first by interim head coach Richie Williams, then by Clint Peay. Before that, Bruce Arena helmed the club from 2019 until resigning in 2023 as a result of an investigation into misconduct. Previously, Mike Lapper was the interim replacement for Brad Friedel, who was appointed the position in 2017 and subsequently fired in 2019. There have been eight permanent managers and six interim managers of the Revolution since the appointment of the club's first professional manager, Frank Stapleton in 1996. The club's longest-serving head coach, in terms of both length of tenure and number of games overseen, is Steve Nicol, who managed the club between 2002 and 2011.

=== Staff ===
Ownership and senior management
Owner	Robert Kraft
President	Brian Bilello
Sporting director	Curt Onalfo
Technical director	Remi Roy
Assistant sporting director	Chris Tierney
Coaching staff
Head coach	Marko Mitrović
Assistant Coach	Michael Morris; Blair Gavin; Sean Hughes
Director of goalkeeping	Kevin Hitchcock
Director of youth development	Rob Becerra

Last updated: September 16, 2025

== Honors ==
The MLS Supporters' Shield

The New England Revolution won their first major MLS trophy, the Supporters' Shield, in 2021, setting a club record for points in a single season. The club has reached the MLS Cup final multiple times but has yet to win the title. They also captured the 2007 U.S. Open Cup, the 2008 North American SuperLiga, and the MLS Team Fair Play Award in multiple seasons.

Domestic
Competitions	Titles	Seasons
Supporters' Shield	1	2021
U.S. Open Cup	1	2007
Eastern Conference (Playoff)	4	2005, 2006, 2007, 2014
Eastern Conference (Regular Season)	3	2002, 2005, 2021
International
Competitions	Titles	Seasons
North American SuperLiga	1^{s}	2008

Notes

- record
- ^{s} shared record

== Awards ==
=== Team ===
- MLS Team Fair Play Award: 2003, 2008, 2012, 2022

=== Players ===
Honor	Player Name	Season
MLS Landon Donovan MVP Award	Carles Gil, Taylor Twellman	2021, 2005
MLS Comeback Player of the Year Award	Carles Gil	2021
MLS Newcomer of the Year Award	Carles Gil	2019
MLS Young Player of the Year Award	Michael Parkhurst, Clint Dempsey	2005, 2004

=== Coaches ===
Honor	Name	Season
Sigi Schmid Coach of the Year Award	Bruce Arena	2021

== Team records ==
=== Year-by-year ===
Results of New England Revolution league and cup competitions by season
Season	League									Position		Playoffs	USOC	CCC	Other		Average attendance (Note: Average attendance is calculated from league matches only.)	Top goalscorer(s) (Note: Top goalscorer(s) includes all goals scored in the regular season, MLS Cup Playoffs, U.S. Open Cup, MLS is Back Tournament, CONCACAF Champions League, and other competitive continental matches. In years with multiple top goalscorers, they are listed in alphabetical order by last name.)	
Season	Pld	W	L	D	GF	GA	GD	Pts	PPG	Conf.	Overall	Playoffs	USOC	CCC	Competition	Result	Average attendance	Name(s)	Goals
2018	34	10	13	11	49	55	−6	41	1.21	8th	16th	DNQ	R4	DNQ	–	–	18,347	(Ecuador) Cristian Penilla	12
2019	34	11	11	12	50	57	−7	45	1.32	7th	14th	R1	Ro16	DNQ	–	–	16,737	(Spain) Carles Gil	10
2020 (Note: The 2020 season was shortened due to the COVID-19 pandemic; league standings were determined using points per game due to an uneven number of matches played. The three group stage matches during the MLS is Back Tournament counted towards regular season standings, while knockout stage matches did not.)	23	8	7	8	26	25	+1	32	1.39	8th	15th	SF	NH (Note: The 2020 and 2021 editions of the U.S. Open Cup were canceled due to the COVID-19 pandemic.)	DNQ	MLS is Back Tournament	Ro16	1,529 (Note: The Revolution played 10 home games without any fans in attendance due to the COVID-19 pandemic.)	(United States) Teal Bunbury	8
2021	34	22	5	7	65	41	+24	73	2.15	1st	1st	QF	NH	DNQ	–	–	12,204 (Note: The Revolution began the 2021 season with Gillette Stadium at 12% capacity. This restriction was lifted on May 29.)	(Poland) Adam Buksa	16
2022	34	10	12	12	47	50	–3	42	1.24	10th	20th	DNQ	Ro16	QF	–	–	21,221	(Poland) Adam Buksa	11
2023	34	15	9	10	58	46	+12	55	1.62	5th	6th	QF	R4	DNQ	Leagues Cup	Ro16	23,940	(Argentina) Gustavo Bou (Spain) Carles Gil	11
2024	34	9	21	4	37	74	-37	31	0.91	14th	26th	DNQ	DNE	QF	Leagues Cup	Ro32	29,262	(Albania) Giacomo Vrioni	12
2025	34	9	16	9	44	51	-7	36	1.06	11th	23rd	DNQ	Ro16	DNQ	-	-	24,477	(Spain) Carles Gil	10
