= Furkan Motori =

Swedish footballer

Personal information
- Full name: Furkan Nehat Motori
- Date of birth: 18 August 1995 (age 31)
- Place of birth: Sweden
- Height: 1.71 m (5 ft 7 in)
- Position: Midfielder

Team information
- Current team: Österlen FF
- Number: 28

Youth career
- Trelleborgs FF

Senior career*
Years	Team	Apps	(Gls)
2014–2018	Trelleborgs FF	62	(6)
2019–2020	Karlslunds IF	11	(1)
2020-	Österlen FF	0	(0)
- * Club domestic league appearances and goals as of 22:47, 10 June 2019 (UTC)

Furkan Nehat Motori (born 18 August 1995) is a Swedish footballer who plays for Österlen FF.

== Career ==
=== Trelleborgs FF ===
Motori left Trelleborgs FF at the end of 2018, together with four other teammates.

=== Karlslunds IF ===
Motori joined Karlslunds IF on 18 March 2019.
