= Brian Bilello =

American sports executive

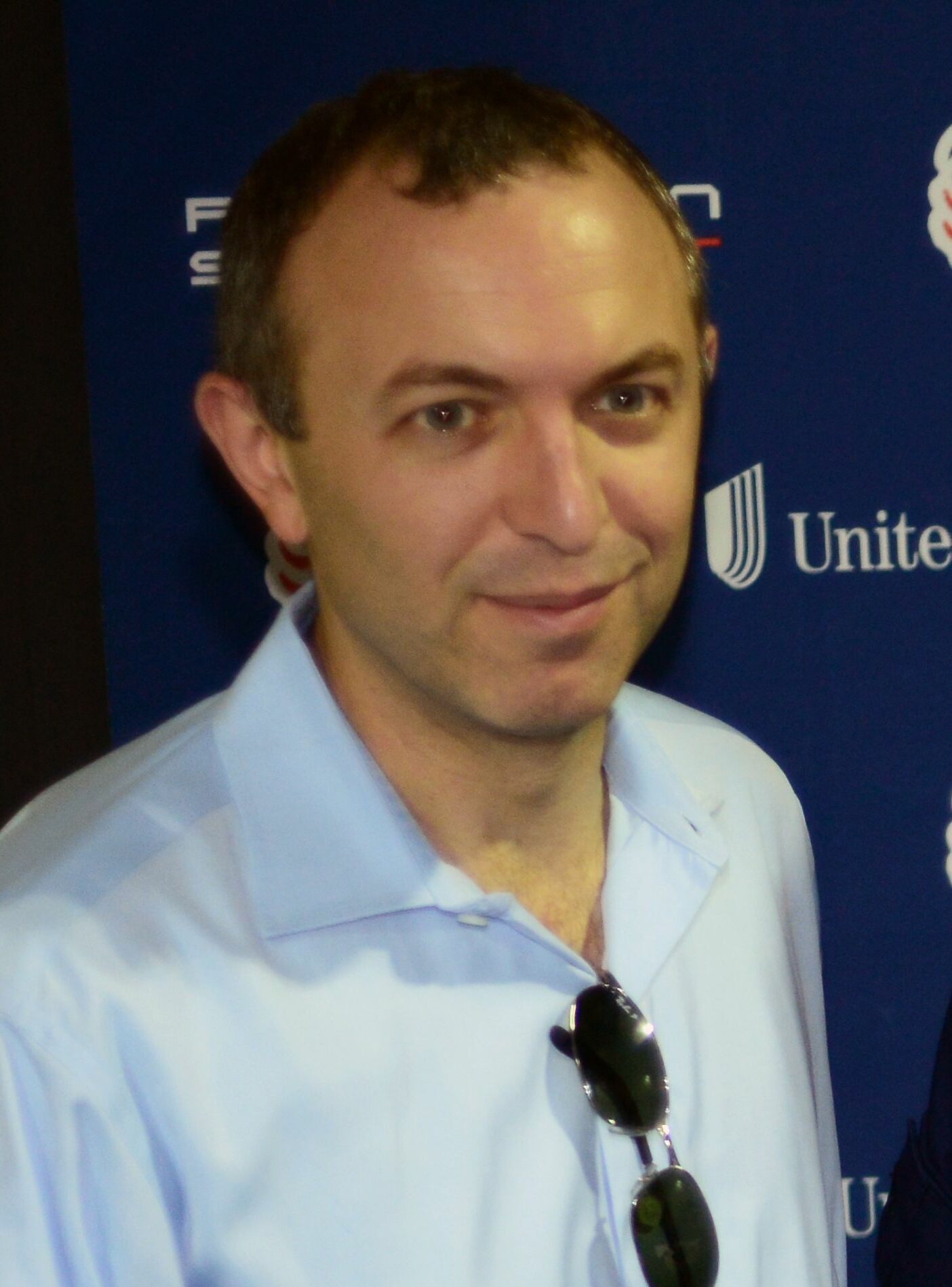
- Bilello in 2013
- Education: Massachusetts Institute of Technology
- Occupation: President of the New England Revolution

Brian Bilello is an American sports executive who serves as the president of Major League Soccer club New England Revolution. Previously, he had served as the Chief Operating Officer since 2006. Bilello joined Kraft Sports Group in 2003 as the Director of Quality and Operational Control.
