= Gökhan Kaba =

Turkish footballer

Personal information
- Date of birth: November 24, 1983 (age 42)
- Place of birth: Adapazarı, Turkey
- Height: 1.80 m (5 ft 11 in)
- Position: Forward

Youth career
- Sakaryaspor

Senior career*
Years	Team	Apps	(Gls)
2004–2005	Sakaryaspor	10	(0)
2005–2006	Çaykur Rizespor	18	(1)
2007–2011	Istanbul BB	35	(5)
2011	→ Çaykur Rizespor (loan)	16	(2)
2011–2012	Kayseri Erciyesspor	25	(10)
2012–2013	Adana Demirspor	13	(7)
2013	Şanlıurfaspor	12	(1)
2013–2014	Alanyaspor	34	(15)
2014–2015	Orduspor	2	(0)
2015	Tepecikspor	2	(0)
- * Club domestic league appearances and goals as of 24 August 2015

Gökhan Kaba (born 24 November 1983) is a Turkish football forward who last played for Tepecikspor.
