= Agim Sopi =

Macedonian football coach (born 1969)

Personal information
- Date of birth: 28 October 1969 (age 57)
- Place of birth: Skopje, SR Macedonia, SFR Yugoslavia (now North Macedonia)

Managerial career
- Years: Team
- 1996–1999: Liria IF
- 1999–2000: Malmö BI (assistant)
- 2001–2005: Shkëndia IF
- 2007: SK Hakoah
- 2008: Näsets FF
- 2008–2009: FK Besa
- 2010: BK Näset
- 2011: Veberöds AIF
- 2012–2013: Rosengård 1917
- 2014–2015: Prespa Birlik
- 2014–2017: Macedonia U21 (assistant)
- 2016–2018: Landskrona BoIS
- 2019–2020: Feronikeli
- 2020–2021: Österlen FF

Agim Sopi (Macedonian: Агим Сопи; born 28 October 1969) is a Macedonian professional football manager.

== Managerial career ==
=== Landskrona BoIS ===
==== 2017 season ====
On 4 November 2017, Sopi and Landskrona BoIS wins the Swedish Division 1 Södra, gaining promotion to Superettan.

=== Feronikeli ===
On 1 November 2019, Feronikeli appointed Sopi to a seven-month contract after the former coach Dejan Vukićević decided to resign after weak results. One day later, he had his first match as Feronikeli manager in a 0–2 home defeat against Ballkani.

=== Österlen FF ===
Sopi began managing Österlen FF in 2020.

The club notably signed American journeyman Freddy Adu briefly. However Adu failed to impress at Österlen FF and was released in February 2021. “We gave him a chance a month or so to see,” Sopi claimed. “But when you are away for so long. He has barely trained with us. He has had defects all along and I do not see that he has the mental strength required to recover."

"I have to take care of it professionally. I have to be honest with him, with myself and tell him how it is. It was not good. We gave him a half last in a training match and what he achieved is at division 5 level. I can not have players who are in a 24-man squad and who give everything and then have a player who is only here for his name. I have been honest with him about what I think and what I have seen. He will not be part of my squad this year", Sopi said of Adu. “Division one is not a simple series. It’s a tough series and you have to have mental strength to handle it,” Sopi added. “I do not see that he has the mental strength to come back simply or who can help the club or the team.”

With two rounds left of Ettan Södra, and the team in the relegation zone, Österlen decided to sack Sopi on 10 November 2021.

== Personal life ==
Sopi was born in Skopje, SFR Yugoslavia by Kosovo Albanian parents.
