= Österlen FF =

Swedish football club

- Full name: Österlen Fotbollförening
- Founded: 2014
- Ground: Skillinge Idrottsplats, Skillinge
- Capacity: 1,000
- Head coach: Agim Sopi
- League: Division 1 Södra
- 2020: Division 2 Östra Götaland, 1st (Promoted)

Österlen Fotbollförening is a Swedish football team from Skillinge, Simrishamn Municipality in the Division 1 Södra. They play their matches at the Skillinge Idrottsplats, Skillinge.

== History ==
Österlen FF is a club formed in 2014, merging the club's Branteviks IF, Skillinge IF, and Rörums SK.

During their 2020 season, Österlen were crowned champions of the Division 2 Östra Götaland and were promoted to Division 1 Södra for the first time in their history.

== Current squad ==
As of 1 April 2021

Note: Flags indicate national team as defined under FIFA eligibility rules; some limited exceptions apply. Players may hold more than one non-FIFA nationality.

No.	Pos.	Nation	Player
1	GK	(Sweden) SWE	Festim Bytyqi
2	DF	(Sweden) SWE	Armend Selimi
4	DF	(Sweden) SWE	Samuel Fröjdh
5	DF	(Sweden) SWE	Erik Rasmusson
6	MF	(Sweden) SWE	Martin Jönsson
7	DF	(Sweden) SWE	Adam Barchan
8	MF	(Sweden) SWE	Oskar Blixt
9	FW	(Sweden) SWE	Granit Sherifi
10	MF	(Sweden) SWE	Jacob Blixt
11	FW	(Sweden) SWE	Victor Blixt
12	FW	(Mali) MLI	Djibril Diawara
14	FW	(Sweden) SWE	Freddie Brorsson
15	MF	(Sweden) SWE	Albin Önneflod

No.	Pos.	Nation	Player
17	MF	(Mali) MLI	Lassine Traoré
18	FW	(Ghana) GHA	Kojo Annor
19	DF	(Sweden) SWE	Emir Osmanovski
20	DF	(Sweden) SWE	Hugo Bjurnemark
21	GK	(Sweden) SWE	Zakaria Abdulrazek
22	MF	(Sweden) SWE	Hugo Hellichius
23	MF	(Sweden) SWE	Florent Sopi
25	DF	(Sweden) SWE	Robin Jakobsson
27	FW	(Nigeria) NGA	Edafe Egbedi
28	MF	(Sweden) SWE	Furkan Motori
33	FW	(Sweden) SWE	Zoran Jovanović
96	MF	(Sweden) SWE	Bassam Ahmad

== Staff ==
(North Macedonia) Agim Sopi – Head Coach
(Sweden) Ted Helmesjö – Assistant Coach
(Sweden) Jonas Nilsson – Goalkeeping Coach

== Achievements ==
=== League ===
- Division 2 Östra Götaland
  - Winners (1): 2020
- Division 3 Södra Götaland
  - Winners (1): 2016
