= Freddie Brorsson =

Swedish footballer

Personal information
- Full name: Hans Freddie Brorsson
- Date of birth: 4 June 1997 (age 29)
- Place of birth: Sweden
- Height: 1.76 m (5 ft 9 in)
- Position: Forward

Team information
- Current team: Österlen FF
- Number: 14

Youth career
- 2001–2007: Trelleborgs FF
- 2007–2009: BK Näset
- 2010–2015: Malmö FF

Senior career*
Years	Team	Apps	(Gls)
2015–2018	Trelleborgs FF	49	(3)
2019	Örgryte IS	18	(0)
2020–	Österlen FF	21	(3)

International career
2014	Sweden U-19	2	(0)
- * Club domestic league appearances and goals as of 13:54, 2 January 2022 (UTC)

Hans Freddie Brorsson (born 4 June 1997) is a Swedish footballer who plays as a forward for Österlen FF.

== Career ==
Brorsson started playing football in Trelleborgs FF when he was four years old. At the age of ten, the family moved to Höllviken and Brorsson started instead in BK Näset. After a two years in the club, Brorsson went to Malmö FF.

In July 2015, Brorsson joined Trelleborgs FF. In November 2016, he extended his contract by two years.

In December 2018, Brorsson was bought by Örgryte IS, where he signed a two-year contract. In March 2020, Brorsson and Örgryte IS agreed to terminate the contract. Later in the same month, he joined Division 2 club Österlen FF.
