= Joonas =

Masculine given name

- Gender: Male

Origin
- Region of origin: Estonia, Finland

Joonas is an Estonian and Finnish given name, a cognate of Jonas. Notable people with the given name include:

- Joonas Alanne (born 1990), Finnish ice hockey player
- Joonas Angeria (born 1989), Finnish music producer, songwriter and musician
- Joonas Cavén (born 1993), Finnish basketball player
- Joonas Donskoi (born 1992), Finnish ice hockey player
- Joonas Granberg (born 1986), Finnish golfer
- Joonas Hallikainen (born 1985), Finnish ice hockey player
- Joonas Henttala (born 1991), Finnish racing cyclist
- Joonas Hurri (born 1991), Finnish ice hockey player
- Joonas Iisalo (born 1986), Finnish basketball coach and former player
- Joonas Ikäläinen (born 1982), Finnish footballer
- Joonas Jääskeläinen (born 1973), Finnish ice hockey player
- Joonas Jalvanti (born 1988), Finnish ice hockey player
- Joonas Järveläinen (born 1990), Estonian basketball player
- Joonas Järvinen (born 1989), Finnish ice hockey player
- Joonas Kemppainen (born 1988), Finnish ice hockey player
- Joonas Kokkonen (1921–1996), Finnish composer
- Joonas Kolkka (born 1974), Finnish footballer
- Joonas Komulainen (born 1990), Finnish ice hockey player
- Joonas Korpisalo (born 1994), Finnish ice hockey player
- Joonas Koskinen (born 1987), Finnish ice hockey player
- Joonas Kuusela (born 1990), Finnish ice hockey player
- Joonas Kylmäkorpi (born 1980), Finnish motorcycle speedway rider
- Joonas Laurikainen (born 1983), Finnish footballer
- Joonas Lehtivuori (born 1988), Finnish ice hockey player
- Joonas Liimatainen (born 1991), Finnish ice hockey player
- Joonas Lindgren (born 1986), Finnish sailor and Olympic competitor
- Joonas Myyrä (1892–1955), Finnish javelin thrower
- Joonas Nättinen (born 1991), Finnish ice hockey player
- Joonas Pöntinen (born 1990), Finnish footballer
- Joonas Rask (born 1990), Finnish ice hockey player
- Joonas Riekkinen (born 1987), Finnish ice hockey player
- Joonas Riismaa (born 2002), Estonian basketball player
- Joonas Ronnberg (born 1983), Finnish ice hockey player
- Joonas Sammalmaa (born 1991), Finnish ice hockey player
- Joonas Sarelius (born 1979), Finnish footballer
- Joonas Sildre (born 1980), Estonian comics artist, illustrator and graphic designer
- Joonas Suotamo (born 1986), Finnish actor and former basketball player
- Joonas Tamm (born 1992), Estonian footballer
- Joonas Toivanen (born 1991), Finnish ice hockey player
- Joonas Vaino (born 1992), Estonian basketball player
- Joonas Valkonen (born 1993), Finnish ice hockey player
- Joonas Vihko (born 1981), Finnish ice hockey player

== As a surname ==
- Velly Joonas (born 1955), Estonian musician, songwriter and poet
