= Rönnberg =

Rönnberg is a Swedish surname that may refer to:

- Glenn Rönnberg (born 1961), a Swedish footballer
- Hanna Rönnberg (1862–1946), a Finnish artist and writer
- Jerker Rönnberg (born 1953), a Swedish professor of psychology
- Joonas Rönnberg (born 1983), a Finnish professional ice hockey defenceman
- Lennart Rönnberg (1938–2022), a Swedish Army major general
- Mikael Rönnberg (born 1957), a Swedish footballer
- Nico Rönnberg (born 1992), a Finnish handball player
- Roger Rönnberg (born 1971), a Swedish ice hockey coach
