= Kuusela =

Kuusela is a Finnish surname. Notable people with the surname include:

- Walter Kuusela (1903–1985), Finnish farmworker, farmer and politician
- Keijo Kuusela (1921–1984), Finnish ice hockey players
- Seppo Kuusela (1934–2014), Finnish basketball player, basketball coach, and handball player
- Armi Kuusela (born 1934), Finnish beauty queen, Miss Universe 1952
- Martti Kuusela (born 1945), Finnish football manager
- Matti Kuusela (born 1956), Finnish journalist
- Panu Kuusela (born 1979), Finnish footballer
- Kristian Kuusela (born 1983), Finnish professional ice hockey player
- Joonas Kuusela (born 1990), Finnish professional ice hockey goaltender
