= Vaino =

Male given name and family name

Vaino or Väino is both a masculine Estonian given name and a surname. Notable people with the name include:

== Given name ==
- Väino Aren (1933–2023), Estonian ballet dancer, actor and operetta singer
- Vaino Tuhafeni Hangula, Namibian politician
- Väino Ilus (born 1929), Estonian writer
- Väino Kull (1943–2025), Estonian politician
- Väino Laes (born 1951), Estonian actor
- Väino Linde (born 1959), Estonian lawyer and politician
- Väino Reinart (born 1962), Estonian diplomat
- Vaino Spencer (1920–2016), American judge
- Vaino Vahing (1940–2008), Estonian writer, prosaist, psychiatrist and playwright
- Vaino Väljas (1931–2024), Estonian Soviet politician, Chairman of the 6th Supreme Soviet of the Estonian SSR
- Vaino Olavi Partanen (1928–1969), Canadian naval chief petty officer
- Väino Puura (born 1951), Estonian opera and operetta singer
- Väino Uibo (1942–2024), Estonian actor and theatre director
- Väinö Voionmaa (1869–1947), Finnish politician and academic

== Surname ==
- Anton Vaino (born 1972), Russian diplomat and politician
- Ants Vaino (1940–1971), Estonian racing driver
- Arnold Vaino (1900–1960), Estonian actor
- Joonas Vaino (born 1992), Estonian basketball player
- Karl Vaino (1923–2022), Soviet Estonian politician
- Maarja Vaino (born 1976), Estonian literary scholar
