= Valkonen =

Valkonen is a Finnish surname. Notable people with the surname include:

- Matti Valkonen (1880–1952), Finnish schoolteacher, farmer and politician
- Sanna Valkonen (born 1977), Finnish football defender
- Joonas Valkonen (born 1993), Finnish ice hockey defenceman
