= Jerker Rönnberg =

Swedish psychologist

Jerker Rönnberg (born 1953) is a Swedish professor of psychology with the emphasis on disability science at Linköping University.

Rönnberg was born in Backe, Sweden. He was awarded a Ph.D. in psychology at Uppsala University in 1980, became a reader (docent) at Umeå University in 1981 and a senior lecturer at Linköping University in 1983. From 1983 to 1984 he was a visiting researcher at the University of Toronto. Since 1997 he is a professor at Linköping University. He is also the director of the Swedish Institute for Disability Research and Linnaeus Centre HEAD (Hearing and Deafness) at Linköping University.

Originally Rönnberg was a memory researcher. His studies in this field lead him on to hearing and hearing impairments, focusing on communication, disability and the important role that cognitive factors play in hearing. He has studied hearing and its interplay with the signal processing in hearing aids and the capacity of the working memory. The findings improve the possibilities to adapt hearing aids individually. Rönnberg has established cognitive hearing science as a new science field.

Rönnberg is editor-in-chief of the Scandinavian Journal of Psychology and a previous assistant editor of the European Journal of Cognitive Psychology. He is also on the editorial board for the Journal of Deaf Studies and Deaf Education and on the advisory board for Advances in Physiotherapy.
