= PANU =

PANU or Panu may refer to:

- New Corrientes Party, a political party in Argentina (Partido Nuevo Corrientes)
- Party of National Unity (Fiji), a political party in Fiji
- National Alliance Party for Unity, a political party in Belgium (Parti de l’Alliance Nationale pour l’Unité)
- Panu (deity), a minor Finnish deity
- Panu, Democratic Republic of the Congo, city in Idiofa area, Kwilu province

== Persons with surname Panu ==
- George Panu, Romanian politician, memoirist and journalist

== Persons with forename Panu ==
- Panu Aaltio (born 1982), a Finnish film composer
- Panu Kuusela (born 1979), a Finnish footballer

== See also ==
- (includes PANU)
