= Toivanen =

Toivanen is a Finnish surname.

== Geographical distribution ==
As of 93.9% of all known bearers of the surname Toivanen were residents of Finland (frequency 1:805) and 2.9% of Sweden (1:46,447).

In Finland, the frequency of the surname was higher than national average (1:805) in the following regions:

1. Northern Savonia (1:136)
2. North Karelia (1:214)
3. Kainuu (1:398)
4. Southern Savonia (1:559)

== People ==
- Ahti Toivanen (born 1990), Finnish biathlete
- Armi Toivanen (born 1980), Finnish actress
- Erkki Toivanen (1938–2011), Finnish journalist
- Irma Toivanen (1922–2010), Finnish politician and teacher
- Joonas Toivanen (born 1991), Finnish ice hockey player
- Laura Toivanen (born 1988), Finnish biathlete, sister or Ahti
- Maarit Toivanen (born 1954), Finnish business executive
