= KemFine =

Custom fine chemicals manufacturer

KemFine Ltd. was a custom fine chemicals manufacturer, producing active pharmaceutical ingredients (API) and intermediates, agrochemicals, and speciality chemicals, which was acquired by the German speciality chemicals company CABB in 2011 and renamed CABB Oy.

KemFine's sites were in Kokkola, Finland and Grangemouth, Scotland, with headquarters in Helsinki, Finland. In 1984, the Finnish chemical conglomerate Kemira erected a multipurpose plant in its Kokkola chemical plant complex. The division was called Kemira Fine Chemicals. In 2004, Kemira sold the business to the investor company 3i. 3i proceeded to complement the new spinoff by buying Avecia Fine Chemicals from Zeneca (originally from Imperial Chemical Industries) and merging it into the company in 2005.

KemFine marketed custom synthesis in the scale of 10 to 100 tons for agrochemicals, and produced pharmaceutical intermediates according to GMP (ICHQ7a) guidelines. It had long-term supply agreements with the top global agrochemical companies, and its customers were other companies.
