= Kälviän kirkonseutu =

Kälviän kirkonseutu Kelviå kyrkosamhälle
- Urban area
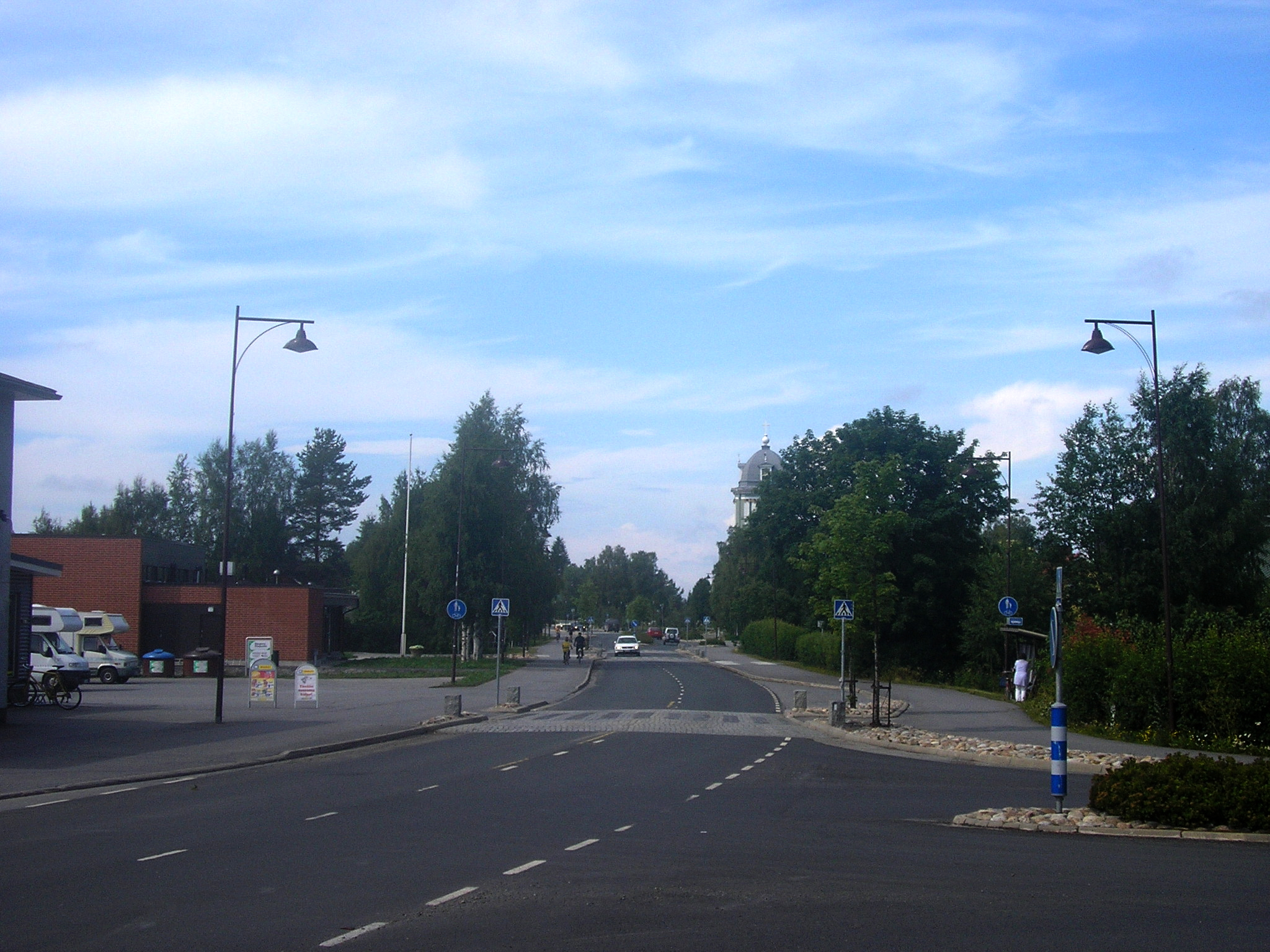

- Location in Central Ostrobothnia
- Coordinates: 63.859°N 23.453°E
- Country: Finland
- Region: Central Ostrobothnia
- Sub-region: Kaustinen sub-region
- Town: Kokkola
- Former municipality: Kälviä

Area
  - Land: 8.47 km^{2} (3.27 sq mi)

Population (2023)
  - Total: 2,295
  - Density: 271/km^{2} (700/sq mi)
- Time zone: UTC+2 (EET)
  - Summer (DST): UTC+3 (EEST)

Kälviän kirkonseutu (Swedish: Kelviå kyrkosamhälle; both lit. 'Kälviä church area') (Note: Also known as Kälviän kirkonkylä, lit. 'Kälviä church village') is an urban area in Kokkola, Finland. Before 2009, it was the administrative center of the Kälviä municipality. As of 31 December 2023, the urban area had a population of 2,295.

Parts of the settlement, including the church and nearby 19th-century farm buildings, have been designated as a nationally important built cultural environment (valtakunnallisesti merkittävä rakennettu kulttuuriympäristö) by the Finnish Heritage Agency.

== Geography ==
The urban area of Kälviän kirkonseutu, as defined by Statistics Finland, had a population of 2,295, a surface area of 8.47 square kilometers (3.27 sq mi) and a population density of 271 inhabitants per square kilometer (700/sq mi) on 31 December 2023. It includes the area around the confluence of the rivers Kälviänjoki and Vähäjoki. The national road 28 and the Seinäjoki–Oulu railway pass through the urban area.

== History ==
The village of Kälviä was first mentioned in 1543 as Kelföö. According to Torsten Evert Karsten, its name is derived from an old Swedish given name Kelve, which appears commonly in 16th-century documents from Ostrobothnia. Kälviä was counted as part of the village of Ruotsalo until the end of the century, when Kälviä had become bigger than Ruotsalo proper. The villages of Ullava and Välikylä were formed on hinterlands of Kälviä in the early 17th century.

The village of Kälviä became a parish center in 1639, when it was separated from the Karleby (Kaarlela) parish, and its first church was finished on the lands of the Hyyppä farm in 1640. The church was looted by Russian troops between 1714 and 1715 during the Great Wrath and was replaced by a new building in 1765. The modern church was built sometime before 1905.

Multiple 19th-century farmhouses have been preserved in the village. One of the oldest farms is Hyyppä, which has existed since the 16th century. Its smaller main building dates to around 1800 and is the birthplace of Lucina Hagman, the founder of the Martha Organization. Other old farms include Siirilä and Näsi further down the Kälviänjoki.

The municipality of Kälviä was consolidated with Kokkola in 2009.

== Services ==
There are three Finnish-language comprehensive schools (peruskoulu) in the urban area: Kälviän kirkonkylän koulu and Marttilan koulu for grades 1–6 as well as Lucina Hagmanin koulu for grades 7–9.
