= Tankar Lighthouse =

Lighthouse in Finland

Tankar Lighthouse Tankar majakka
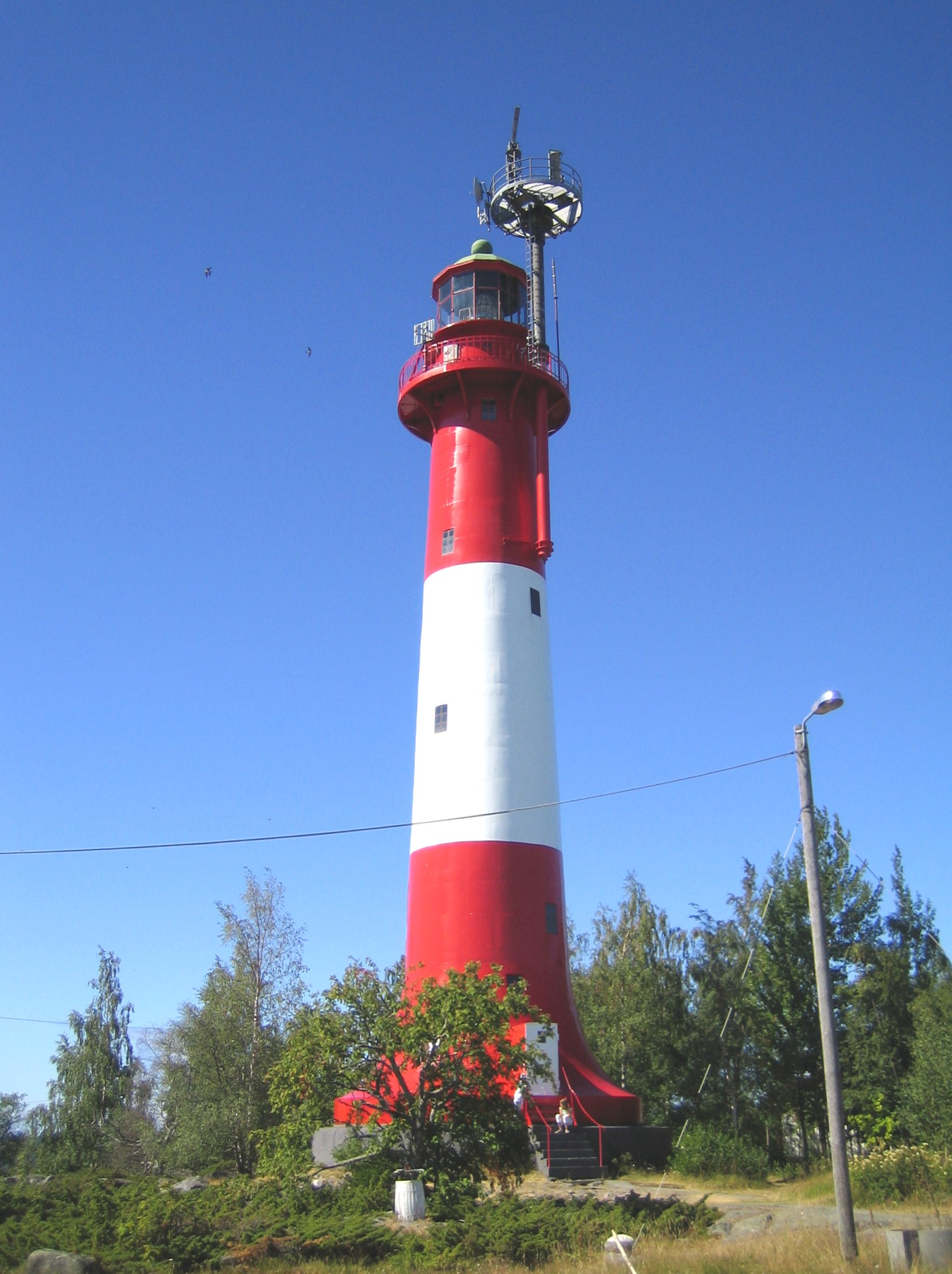
- Tankar Lighthouse in 2006
- Location: Bothnian Bay, Baltic Sea
- Coordinates: 63.9500°N 22.8465°E

Tower
- Constructed: 1888
- Construction: Iron
- Height: 29.6 m (97 ft)
- Markings: Red with white stripe
- Power source: rapeseed oil, electricity
- Heritage: Cultural Heritage Site of National Significance

Light
- First lit: 1889
- Focal height: 37.8 m (124 ft)
- Range: 17.5 nmi (32.4 km; 20.1 mi)
- Characteristic: Fl W 3.5s

Tankar Lighthouse (Finnish: Tankarin majakka, Swedish: Tankar fyr) is a lighthouse located on the island of Tankar in the Bothnian Bay on the west coast of Finland, outside the city of Kokkola, serving the shipping lane to the Port of Kokkola c. 15 kilometres (8.1 nmi) away.

It is not known who designed the lighthouse; one theory suggests the Eiffel Engineering Company. Similarly, the manufacturer of the iron structure is unknown, and possibly of German origin.

The light source used to burn oil, but was converted to electricity in 1961, which also greatly increased the range of the illumination.
