= Kälviä =

Former Finnish municipality

Coordinates: 63°51′40″N 23°27′10″E

Location of Kälviä in Finland

Kälviä (Swedish: Kelviå) is a former municipality of Finland. Kälviä was consolidated with the city of Kokkola on 1 January 2009.

It is located in the province of Western Finland and is part of the Central Ostrobothnia region. The former municipality had a population of 4,475 (2003) and covered an area of 682.36 km^{2} (263.46 sq mi) of which 14.68 km^{2} (5.67 sq mi) was water. The population density was 6.6 inhabitants per square kilometer (17 inhabitants/mi^{2}).

The Coat of Arms of Kälviä

The former municipality was unilingually Finnish.

== Villages ==
Honkimaa, Jatkojoki, Jokikylä, Karhulahti, Kleemola, Kälviä, Miekkoja, Nissi, Passoja, Peitso, Peltokorpi, Porkola, Riippa, Ridankylä, Rimpilä, Ruotsalo, Vuollet, Välikylä, Rita.

Distances:

Kokkola center: 16 km
Oulu: 161 km
Vaasa: 125 km
Helsinki: 419 km
Tampere: 270 km
Turku: 386 km
Rovaniemi: 407 km

== Notable individuals ==
- Asser Stenbäck, doctor and politician
- Esa Riippa, print-maker
- Ilkka Uusitalo, diplomat
- Kauno Kleemola, politician
- Lars Sonck, architect
- Lucina Hagman, teacher and Member of the Parliament of Finland
- Matti Korkiala, pop singer
- Odert W. Renell, architect
- Raimo Kero, singer
- Viljo Elomaa, athlete
- Väinö Siirilä, playwright
