= Port of Kokkola =

Port in Kokkola, Finland

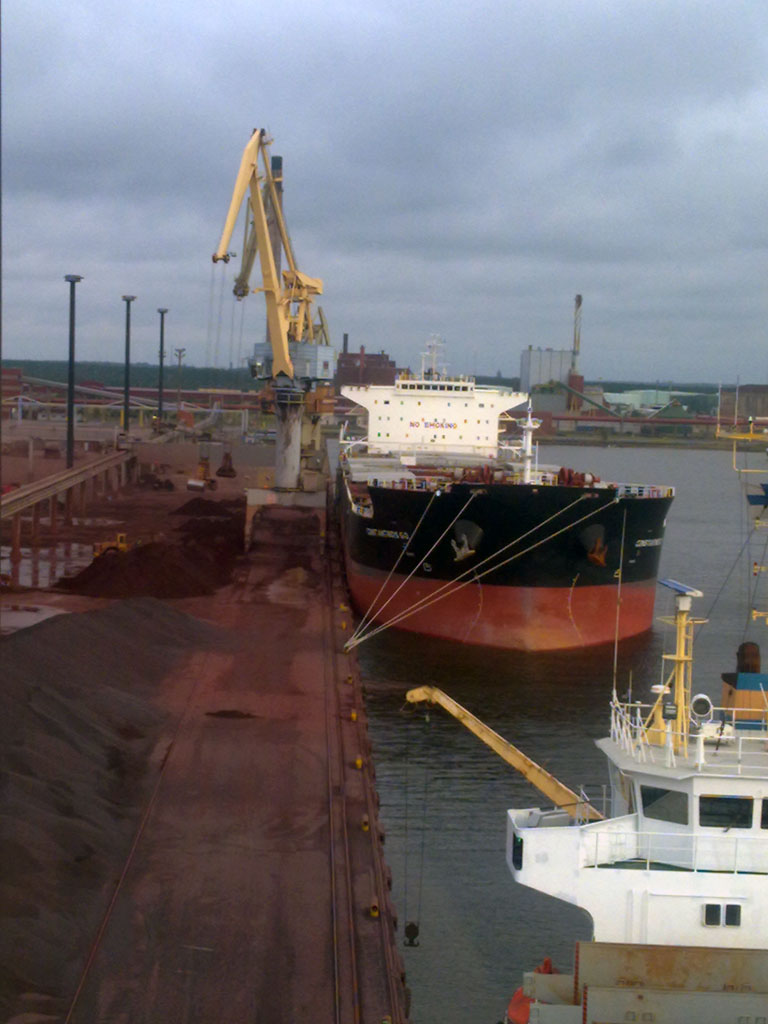
- Port of Kokkola deepwater harbour
- Click on the map for a fullscreen view
- Port of Kokkola (Finland)
- Native name: Kokkolan satama – Karleby hamn

Location
- Country: Finland
- Location: Kokkola
- Coordinates: 63.855556°N 23.013889°E
- UN/LOCODE: FI KOK

Details
- Operated by: Kokkolan Satama Oy
- Type of harbour: coastal natural
- Draft depth: max. 14.0 metres (45.9 ft) depth

Statistics
- Annual cargo tonnage: c. 6.7m tons (int'l) (2018)
- Website https://portofkokkola.fi/en/port-of-kokkola/

The Port of Kokkola is a cargo port located in the city of Kokkola, on the west coast of Finland and the eastern shore of the Bothnian Bay.

== Facilities ==
The port complex consists of three areas:

- Kantasatama 'core' harbour: containerised and general cargo as well as 'clean' bulk; facilities include a covered 'all-weather-terminal'; 5 quays, total length 692 metres (2,270 ft); depth of fairways 4.0–9.5 metres (13.1–31.2 ft)
- Hopeakivi harbour: mainly dealing with light bulk cargo; 2 quays, total length 317 metres (1,040 ft); depth 9.5 metres (31 ft)
- Deepwater harbour: mainly dealing with bulk cargo, accounting for c. 70% of the port's total throughput; 6 quays, total length 1,266 metres (4,154 ft); depth 9.5–14.0 metres (31.2–45.9 ft)

There are also a total of 15 cranes and 79,000 square metres (850,000 sq ft) of warehousing within the complex.

In 2018, the port handled c. 6.7 million tons of international cargo. Of this, c. 77% was exports, making Kokkola the fourth-largest export port in Finland, by tonnage.

== See also ==
- Tankar Lighthouse
