= Centria University of Applied Sciences =

Institute of higher education in Finland

- Centria-ammattikorkeakoulu
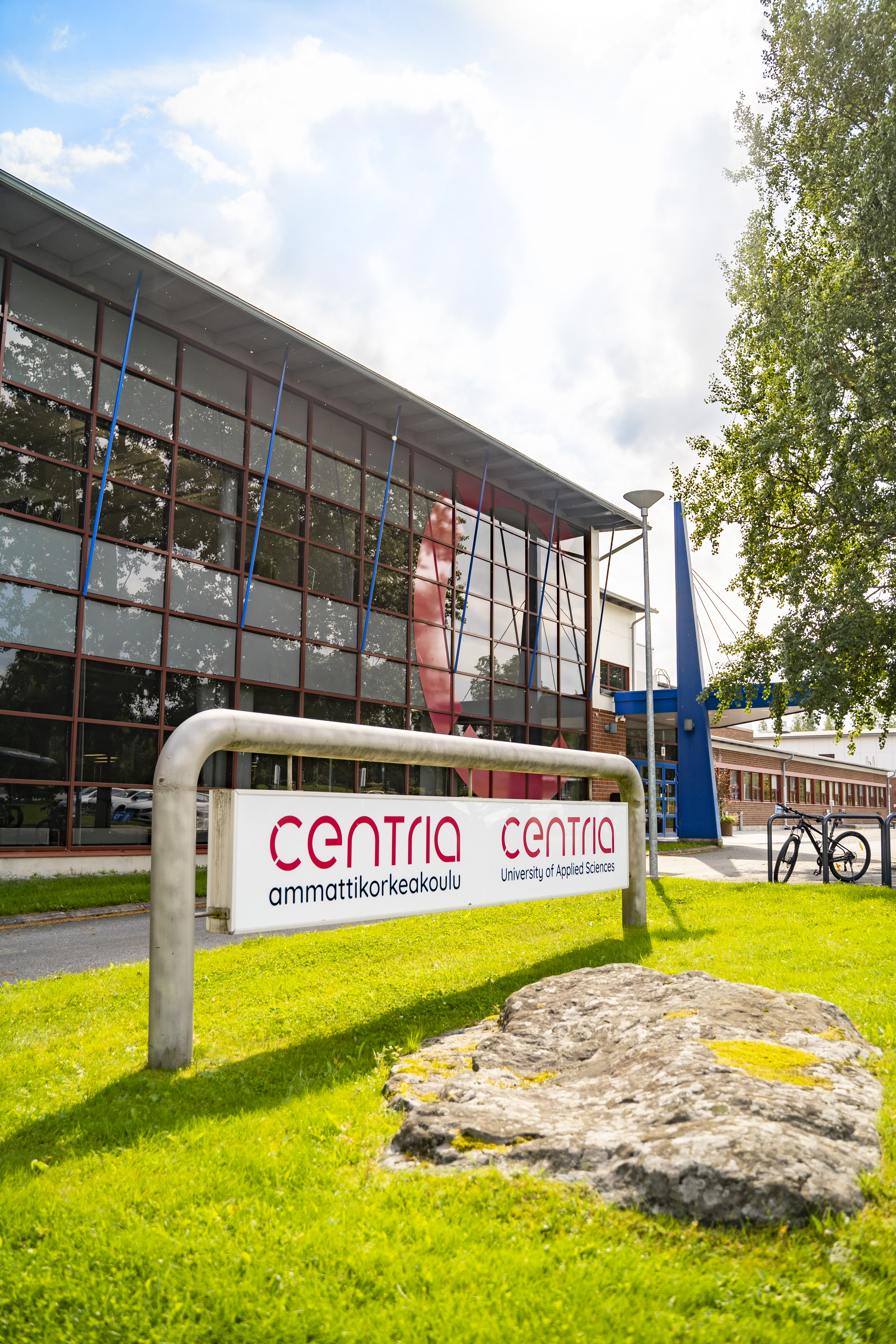
- Type: Ammattikorkeakoulu Osakeyhtiö
- Established: 1995
- Rector: Tapio Huttula
- Students: n. 4 200 (2023)
- Location: Kokkola, Ylivieska, and Jakobstad, Finland
- Campus: Kokkola, Ylivieska, and Jakobstad
- Website: net.centria.fi/en/
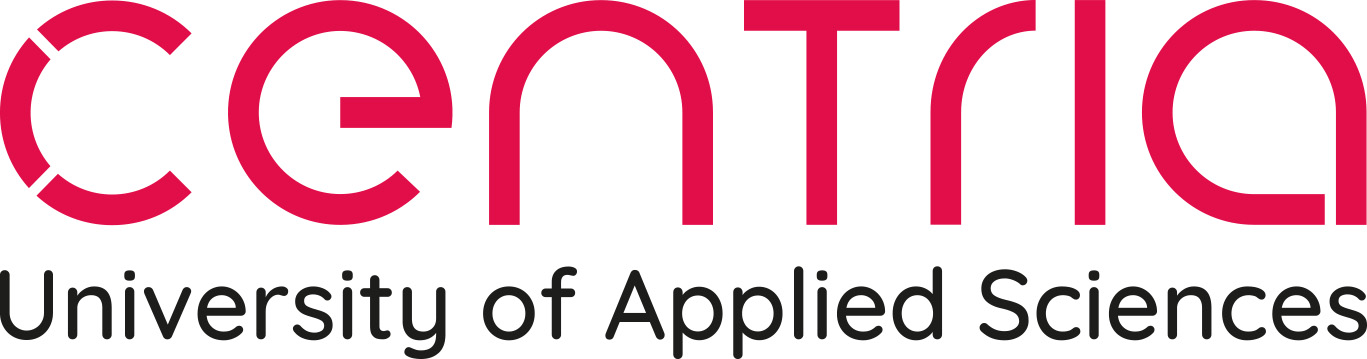

Centria University of Applied Sciences (former name Central Ostrobothnia University of Applied Sciences) (Finnish: Centria-ammattikorkeakoulu) is a university of applied sciences (UAS) in Finland.

The name Centria University of Applied Sciences is derived from Central Ostrobothnia University of Applied Sciences and officially used from the start of autumn semester 2012. The UAS has three campuses: Kokkola, Jakobstad and Ylivieska.

Centria offers higher education in five fields: engineering, business, social and health care, humanities and culture. Bachelor's degree programmes in English are offered in the fields of engineering, business and health care. Master's degree programmes are offered in the fields of engineering and business. One in five of Centria's 4 200 degree students comes from outside Finland.

== Organisation ==
Centria University of Applied Sciences is owned by Centria University of Applied Sciences Ltd. The stakeholders are the City of Kokkola, the City of Ylivieska, the Ostrobothnian Chamber of Commerce, the Central Ostrobothnian Entrepreneurs Association, the Federation of Education in Central Ostrobothnia, the Education Federation of the Jokilaakso Region, the City of Jakobstad, the Raudaskylä Christian College Association and the Central Ostrobothnia Conservatory Association. The main shareholder is the City of Kokkola with a 27 percent share.

The university of applied sciences employs 320 people.

== Studies at Centria University of Applied Sciences ==
Centria is multidisciplinary institution located in Western Finland, Northern Europe and offers degree programmes in the fields of

- Engineering
- Business
- Social and health care
- Culture
- Humanities

The extent of UAS Bachelor's degree studies is generally 210−240 credits (ECTS), which means 3.5–4 years of studies. The entry requirement is a certificate from an upper secondary school or the matriculation certificate, a vocational qualification or corresponding foreign studies. The requirement for Master's studies at a Centria is a Bachelors' level degree and at least two years of relevant work experience gained after the Bachelor's degree. The UAS Master's degree, which is 60–90 credits and usually takes 1–1,5 years, is equivalent to a university Master's degree in the labour market.

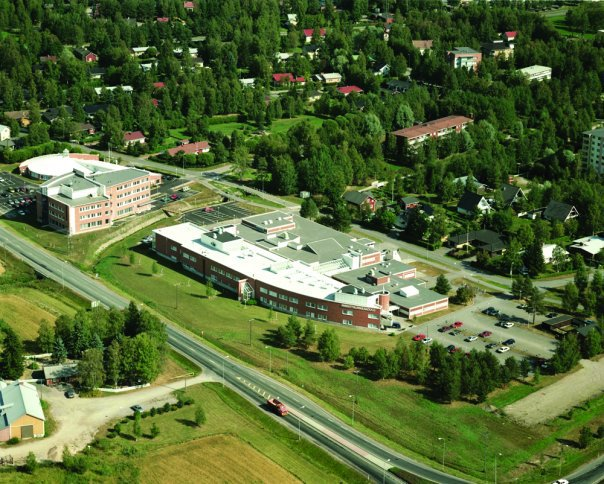
Ylivieska Campus – bird's eye view

== See also ==
- University of Applied Sciences, Finnish: Ammattikorkeakoulu
- Education in Finland
- List of polytechnics in Finland
- List of universities in Finland
- List of colleges and universities
- List of colleges and universities by country
