= Sokoja =

Coordinates: 63°45′38″N 23°12′8″E

Sokoja (Swedish: Såka) is a settlement in the municipality of Kokkola (Karleby in Swedish), in the province of Western Finland. Sokoja has a population of 900 and covers an area 40 square kilometres (15 mi^{2}). Sokoja consists of five different areas: Övre-Såka, Såka, Wentjärvi, Koivisto, and Rasmus.

The oldest stone barn in Finland (1748) is located in the Rasmus area, and so is the architecturally remarkable brick house built in 1779.

The financial center of Sokoja is located between the Såka and Wentjärvi areas, and it is often called "Såka city". This is the center for logistics in the whole of Såka.
