= Kokkola =

Town in Central Ostrobothnia, Finland

Kokkola Kokkola (Finnish) Karleby (Swedish)
- Town
- Kokkolan kaupunki Karleby stad
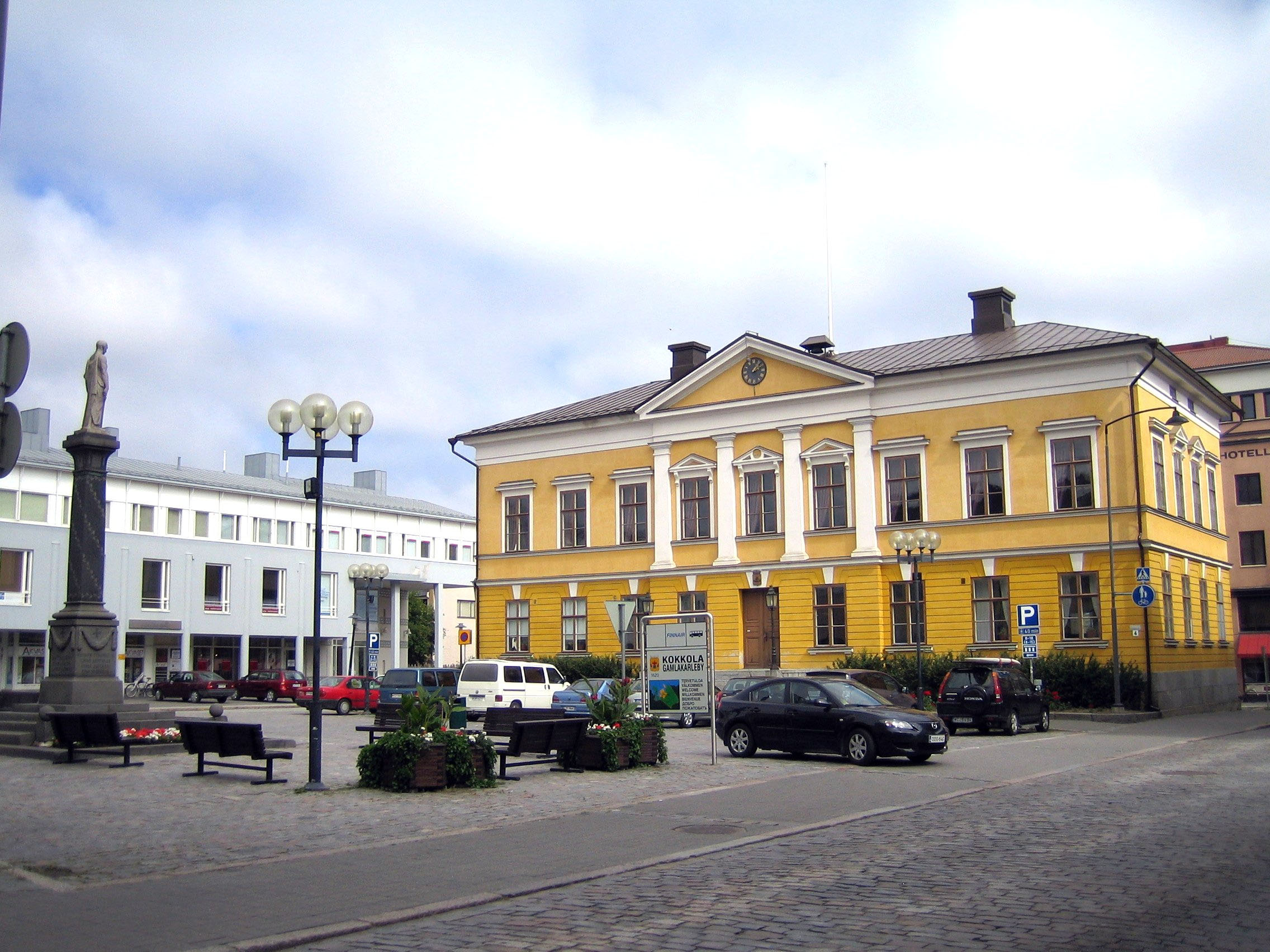
- Old Kokkola town hall

- Flag Coat of arms

- Location of Kokkola in Finland
- Interactive map of Kokkola
- Coordinates: 63°50.2′N 023°08′E
- Country: Finland
- Region: Central Ostrobothnia
- Sub-region: Kokkola sub-region
- Charter: 1620

Government
  - Town manager: Stina Mattila

Area (2018-01-01)
  - Total: 2,730.80 km^{2} (1,054.37 sq mi)
  - Land: 1,446.27 km^{2} (558.41 sq mi)
  - Water: 1,286.61 km^{2} (496.76 sq mi)
  - Rank: 46th largest in Finland

Population (2025-12-31)
  - Total: 48,338
  - Rank: 22nd largest in Finland
  - Density: 33.42/km^{2} (86.6/sq mi)

Population by native language
  - Finnish: 82.1% (official)
  - Swedish: 11.7% (official)
  - Others: 6.2%

Population by age
  - 0 to 14: 18.6%
  - 15 to 64: 58.8%
  - 65 or older: 22.6%
- Time zone: UTC+02:00 (EET)
  - Summer (DST): UTC+03:00 (EEST)
- Website: www.kokkola.fi/en/

Kokkola (Finnish: [ˈkokːolɑ]; Swedish: Karleby, Finland Swedish: [ˈkɑrleˌbyː]) is a town in Finland, and the regional capital of Central Ostrobothnia. It is located on the west coast of the country, on the Gulf of Bothnia. The population of Kokkola is approximately 48,000; central Ostrobothnia, inclusive of Kokkola, has a population of approximately 54,000 in total. Kokkola is the 22nd most populous municipality in Finland, and the 20th most populous urban area in Finland.

Kokkola covers an area of 2,730.80 square kilometres (1,054.37 sq mi), of which 1,286.61 km^{2} (496.76 sq mi) is water. The population density is 33.42 inhabitants per square kilometre (86.6/sq mi). Neighbour municipalities are Halsua, Kalajoki, Kannus, Kaustinen, Kronoby, Lestijärvi, Larsmo, and Toholampi.

Kokkola is a bilingual municipality, with Finnish and Swedish as its official languages. The population consists of 82% primarily Finnish speakers, 12% primarily Swedish speakers, and 6% primarily speakers of other languages (including English).

== Etymology ==
=== Name ===
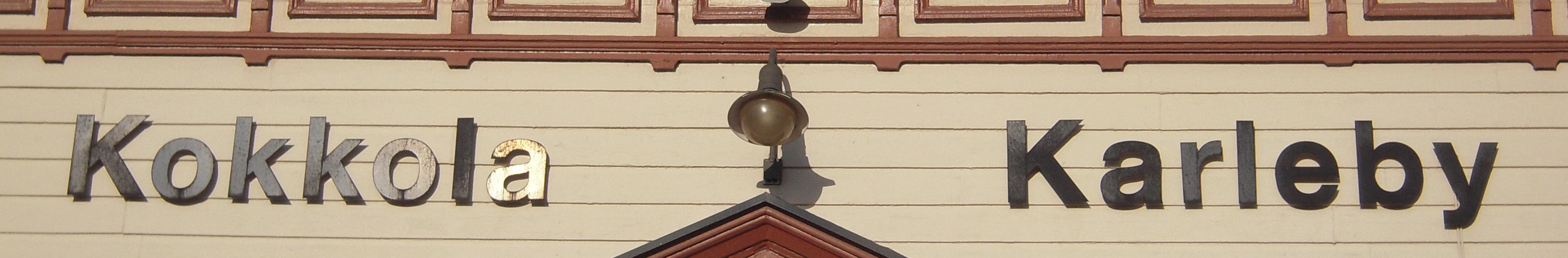
The bilingual sign at the train station.

In the oldest Swedish sources, Kokkola is mentioned as Karlabi. The town was known in Swedish by the name Gamlakarleby until 1 January 1977 when the surrounding land municipality of Kaarlela (Swedish: Karleby) was consolidated with Kokkola, and the entirety of the combined town took the Swedish name Karleby. The word "gamla" means "old"; "karl" (anglicanized Charles) is a Germanic males name (and the first name of many kings) meaning "man"; and "by" means "village". The town name is somewhat ambiguous in meaning, then, as either "old village of Charles" or "old man village". The Latin name was Carolina Vetus. Gustav II Adolf, the founder of the city, possibly named the town in honor of his father King Karl IX of Sweden.

The Finnish name, Kokkola, is possibly derived from Kokkolahti, a narrow bay located at the place of the town. According to a tale, sea eagles (in Finnish, merikotka or kokko) used to live there. Another theory claims that the name comes from ancient signal fires (kokko), which were used to warn people about approaching enemy troops.

=== Heraldry ===
The coat of arms of Kokkola is based on the seal of the city, which was issued in 1620 in connection with the founding of the city. The imagery of tar burning and tar trade, which have played a significant part in the history of the city since its founding until the 19th century, is prominent. The coat of arms was designed by Olof Eriksson and Into I. Suominen, and it was confirmed for use on 17 December 1956.

== History ==
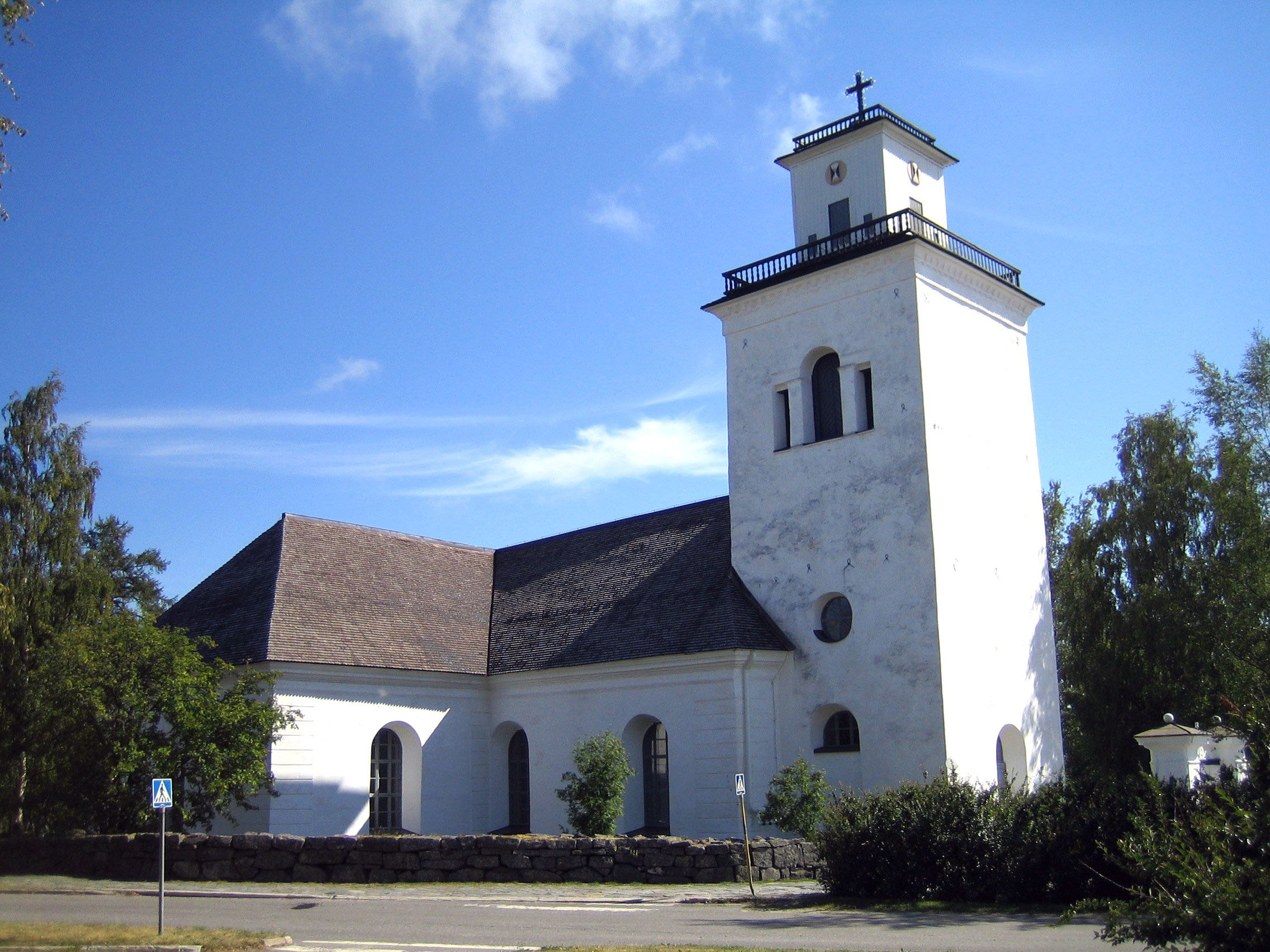
Kaarlela church

The town of Kokkola was chartered in 1620 by King Gustav II Adolf of Sweden when Finland was a part of the Swedish Empire and is one of the oldest towns in Finland. The king also decided that a tar barrel, with three burning flames coming from both the ends and the plug, should be used as the town seal, because of the tar trade at that time, for which Kokkola was founded as a shipping port.

Anders Chydenius (1729-1803) who was one of the leading politicians of Sweden, was a keen supporter of economic freedom and fought in the Swedish Parliament for free foreign trade and further social reforms. In 1765 the Swedish Parliament granted the city of Kokkola the staple rights.

Kokkola also became an important shipbuilding centre in Finland.

As a result of tar trade and shipbuilding industry, Kokkola was for a time one of the richest towns in Finland.

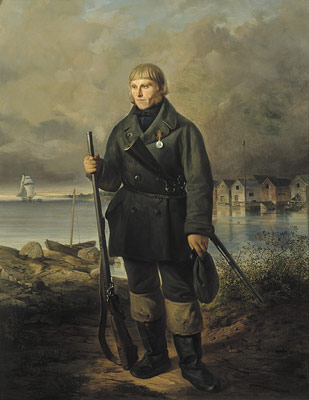
Matts Kankkonen defended Kokkola during the skirmish of Halkokari.

An interesting historical affair, known as the Skirmish of Halkokari, occurred at the town on 7 June 1854 during the Åland War, part of the Crimean War. Royal Marines from HMS Vulture and HMS Odin tried to come ashore to deal with public property in the town "in accordance with the usages of war". The marines were repelled by local defenders armed with hunting rifles supported by troops, artillery and possibly Russian advisors and military. One of the 9 smaller British craft (a gunboat) fell into the hands of the defenders. As such, this boat was the only Royal Navy vessel still in foreign possession in 1914. The boat is still today a museum-object and can be seen in Kokkola's English Park. The town council has refused to return the boat despite several requests by the United Kingdom, most recently by John Stuttard, the Lord Mayor of London. The British Treasury annually pays a small sum to the local church congregation for the maintenance of the graves of nine Royal Marines killed in action during the skirmish .

Interesting contemporaneous accounts of the disastrous action can be found in the British Newspaper Archive, citing Gamla Carleby.

The city had a Swedish-speaking majority until 1933.

In 1977, the surrounding municipality of Kaarlela (Swedish: Karleby) was consolidated into Kokkola (Swedish until then: Gamlakarleby). In 2009, the municipalities of Lohtaja, Kälviä and Ullava were consolidated with Kokkola.

== Geography ==
Map of the entire Kokkola area after the municipal consolidations

Kokkola is the capital of the Central Ostrobothnia region, it is located on the coast of Gulf of Bothnia, the northernmost part of the Baltic Sea. The next larger cities are Vaasa is 121 kilometres (75 miles) southwest, and Oulu is 198 kilometres (123 miles) northeast. The distance to the capital Helsinki is 483 kilometres (300 miles) to the south. Neighbouring cities and municipals are Kalajoki in the northern east, Kannus and Toholampi in the east, Halsua and Kaustinen in the southern east, Kronoby in the south and Larsmo in the southern west.

The landscape of the region around Kokkola is flat, typical for the area of Ostrobothnia, with numerous river courses flowing through the land. The biggest river in the area is Perhonjoki, which flows into Gulf of Bothnia, north of Kokkola.

The annual post-glacial rebound at Kokkola is 8.8 mm. Thus large areas of present-day Kokkola were under water when the town was founded.

=== Climate ===
Climate data for Kokkola-Pietarsaari Airport (Kronoby), normals 1991-2020, extremes 1961-present, precipitation from Santahaka
| Month | Jan | Feb | Mar | Apr | May | Jun | Jul | Aug | Sep | Oct | Nov | Dec | Year |
|---|---|---|---|---|---|---|---|---|---|---|---|---|---|
| Record high °C (°F) | 9.5 (49.1) | 10.4 (50.7) | 13.9 (57.0) | 21.4 (70.5) | 29.6 (85.3) | 32.6 (90.7) | 34.3 (93.7) | 31.3 (88.3) | 27.6 (81.7) | 20.9 (69.6) | 12.3 (54.1) | 8.4 (47.1) | 34.3 (93.7) |
| Mean maximum °C (°F) | 4.2 (39.6) | 4.1 (39.4) | 8.1 (46.6) | 16.4 (61.5) | 24.1 (75.4) | 26.2 (79.2) | 28.7 (83.7) | 26.8 (80.2) | 20.7 (69.3) | 13.1 (55.6) | 8.2 (46.8) | 5.0 (41.0) | 29.5 (85.1) |
| Mean daily maximum °C (°F) | −3.2 (26.2) | −3.2 (26.2) | 0.9 (33.6) | 7.4 (45.3) | 14.1 (57.4) | 18.5 (65.3) | 21.7 (71.1) | 19.6 (67.3) | 14.2 (57.6) | 6.8 (44.2) | 1.8 (35.2) | −1.0 (30.2) | 8.1 (46.6) |
| Daily mean °C (°F) | −6.2 (20.8) | −6.9 (19.6) | −3.3 (26.1) | 2.4 (36.3) | 8.3 (46.9) | 13.5 (56.3) | 16.4 (61.5) | 14.6 (58.3) | 9.6 (49.3) | 3.8 (38.8) | −0.5 (31.1) | −3.9 (25.0) | 4.0 (39.2) |
| Mean daily minimum °C (°F) | −10.1 (13.8) | −10.6 (12.9) | −7.4 (18.7) | −2.2 (28.0) | 2.4 (36.3) | 7.6 (45.7) | 11.1 (52.0) | 9.5 (49.1) | 5.2 (41.4) | 0.5 (32.9) | −3.1 (26.4) | −6.7 (19.9) | −0.3 (31.4) |
| Mean minimum °C (°F) | −25.1 (−13.2) | −24.8 (−12.6) | −20.2 (−4.4) | −10.6 (12.9) | −5.4 (22.3) | −0.1 (31.8) | 3.5 (38.3) | 1.9 (35.4) | −3.1 (26.4) | −9.5 (14.9) | −13.4 (7.9) | −19.9 (−3.8) | −28.6 (−19.5) |
| Record low °C (°F) | −40.5 (−40.9) | −41.5 (−42.7) | −33.4 (−28.1) | −22.2 (−8.0) | −10.1 (13.8) | −3.6 (25.5) | −0.5 (31.1) | −3.2 (26.2) | −8.6 (16.5) | −22.2 (−8.0) | −32.2 (−26.0) | −37.9 (−36.2) | −41.5 (−42.7) |
| Average precipitation mm (inches) | 37 (1.5) | 28 (1.1) | 28 (1.1) | 29 (1.1) | 44 (1.7) | 51 (2.0) | 73 (2.9) | 65 (2.6) | 52 (2.0) | 59 (2.3) | 52 (2.0) | 46 (1.8) | 564 (22.2) |
| Average precipitation days (≥ 1.0 mm) | 10 | 8 | 7 | 7 | 8 | 8 | 10 | 9 | 9 | 11 | 11 | 11 | 109 |
| Average relative humidity (%) (daily average) | 90 | 88 | 82 | 74 | 68 | 68 | 74 | 80 | 85 | 89 | 92 | 92 | 82 |
Source 1: FMI climatological normals for Finland 1991–2020
Source 2: Record highs and lows

Climate data for Kokkola Tankar (1991–2020 normals, extremes 1996- present)
| Month | Jan | Feb | Mar | Apr | May | Jun | Jul | Aug | Sep | Oct | Nov | Dec | Year |
|---|---|---|---|---|---|---|---|---|---|---|---|---|---|
| Record high °C (°F) | 6.0 (42.8) | 6.3 (43.3) | 11.1 (52.0) | 18.5 (65.3) | 23.3 (73.9) | 28.6 (83.5) | 30.2 (86.4) | 30.3 (86.5) | 23.4 (74.1) | 18.4 (65.1) | 11.0 (51.8) | 7.7 (45.9) | 30.3 (86.5) |
| Mean daily maximum °C (°F) | −2.1 (28.2) | −3.1 (26.4) | 0.1 (32.2) | 4.3 (39.7) | 9.8 (49.6) | 14.9 (58.8) | 18.7 (65.7) | 17.9 (64.2) | 13.3 (55.9) | 7.3 (45.1) | 2.8 (37.0) | 0.1 (32.2) | 7.0 (44.6) |
| Daily mean °C (°F) | −4.5 (23.9) | −5.8 (21.6) | −3.1 (26.4) | 1.1 (34.0) | 6.1 (43.0) | 11.5 (52.7) | 15.7 (60.3) | 15.3 (59.5) | 11.1 (52.0) | 5.7 (42.3) | 1.2 (34.2) | −1.8 (28.8) | 4.4 (39.9) |
| Mean daily minimum °C (°F) | −7.0 (19.4) | −8.5 (16.7) | −5.5 (22.1) | −1.2 (29.8) | 3.9 (39.0) | 9.5 (49.1) | 13.6 (56.5) | 13.2 (55.8) | 9.1 (48.4) | 3.9 (39.0) | −0.6 (30.9) | −3.9 (25.0) | 2.2 (36.0) |
| Record low °C (°F) | −30.2 (−22.4) | −28.3 (−18.9) | −23.7 (−10.7) | −16.2 (2.8) | −4.8 (23.4) | 1.8 (35.2) | 7.3 (45.1) | 6.5 (43.7) | 2.0 (35.6) | −6.5 (20.3) | −17.7 (0.1) | −25.4 (−13.7) | −30.2 (−22.4) |
| Average relative humidity (%) | 88 | 88 | 85 | 83 | 80 | 80 | 82 | 82 | 83 | 85 | 89 | 89 | 85 |
Source 1: FMI normals 1991-2020
Source 2: Record highs and lows

== Demographics ==
=== Population ===
Historical population
| Year | Pop. | ±% p.a. |
|---|---|---|
| 1815 | 1,799 | — |
| 1850 | 2,379 | +0.80% |
| 1870 | 1,977 | −0.92% |
| 1890 | 2,302 | +0.76% |
| 1910 | 3,714 | +2.42% |
| 1920 | 4,130 | +1.07% |
| 1930 | 5,703 | +3.28% |
| 1939 | 9,063 | +5.28% |
| 1972 | 39,497 | +4.56% |
| 1980 | 41,848 | +0.73% |
| 1990 | 43,267 | +0.33% |
| 2000 | 44,182 | +0.21% |
| 2010 | 46,260 | +0.46% |
| 2020 | 47,772 | +0.32% |
Source: Tilastollinen päätoimisto, Statistics Finland (1972-2020)

The city of Kokkola has 48,338 inhabitants, making it the 22nd most populous municipality in Finland. The Kokkola region has a population of 53,584.

Population size 1990–2025
| Year | Population |
|---|---|
| 1990 | 43,267 |
| 1995 | 44,441 |
| 2000 | 44,182 |
| 2005 | 44,627 |
| 2010 | 46,260 |
| 2015 | 47,570 |
| 2020 | 47,772 |
| 2025 | 48,338 |

==== Urban areas ====
As of 31 December 2023, there were 48,295 people living in Kokkola, of whom 42,608 lived in urban areas (taajama), 5,213 lived outside them and 474 lived in an unknown location.

There are eight urban areas in Kokkola:

- Kokkolan keskustaajama (central urban area; 37,591)
- Kälviän kirkonseutu (2,295)
- Lohtajan kirkonkylä (744)
- Marinkainen (517)
- Peltokorpi (495)
- Ruotsalo (432)
- Sokoja (274)
- Knivsund (260)

=== Languages ===
Population by
mother tongue (2025)
1. Finnish (82.1%)
2. Swedish (11.7%)
3. Ukrainian (0.90%)
4. Russian (0.80%)
5. English (0.40%)
6. Chinese (0.40%)
7. Nepali (0.40%)
8. Other (3.30%)

The city of Kokkola is officially bilingual, with both Finnish and Swedish as official languages. The majority of the population, 39,681 persons (82.1%), spoke Finnish as their first language. The number of Swedish speakers was 5,641 persons (11.7%) of the population. Foreign languages were spoken by 6.2% of the population. As English and Swedish - or Finnish for Swedish speakers - are compulsory school subjects, functional bilingualism or trilingualism acquired through language studies is not uncommon.

Kokkola marks the northernmost settlement area of the Swedish-speakers (Fenno-Swedish) on the western coast of Finland. The Swedish-speaking inhabitants of Kokkola are spread unevenly around Kokkola: Whereas the centre of the city is bilingual, the majority of the villages around Kokkola mostly speak Swedish. The districts which were consolidated in 2009 are, however, pure Finnish-speaking areas.

At least 30 different languages are spoken in Kokkola. The most common foreign languages are Ukrainian (0.9%), Russian (0.8%), English (0.4%) and Chinese (0.4%).

=== Immigration ===
Population by country of birth (2025)
| Country of birth | Population | % |
| Finland | 45,055 | 93.2 |
| Sweden | 417 | 0.9 |
| Soviet Union | 405 | 0.8 |
| Ukraine | 278 | 0.6 |
| China | 164 | 0.3 |
| Nepal | 161 | 0.3 |
| Thailand | 148 | 0.3 |
| Bangladesh | 123 | 0.3 |
| Russia | 93 | 0.2 |
| Vietnam | 84 | 0.2 |
| Other | 1,910 | 4.0 |

As of 2024, there were 2,485 persons with a foreign background living in Kokkola, or 6% of the population. (Note: Statistics Finland classifies a person as having a "foreign background" if both parents or the only known parent were born abroad.) The number of residents who were born abroad was 3,009, or 6% of the population. The number of persons with foreign citizenship living in Kokkola was 1,982. Most foreign-born citizens came from Sweden, the former Soviet Union, Ukraine and Thailand.

The relative share of immigrants in Kokkola's population is below the national average. However, the city's new residents are increasingly of foreign origin. This will increase the proportion of foreign residents in the coming years.

=== Religion ===
In 2023, of Kokkola's total population, 72.5% described themselves, religiously, as Evangelical Lutherans. Other religious affiliations accounted for 2.1% of the population. 25.4% of the population described themselves as having no formal religious affiliation.

== Economy ==
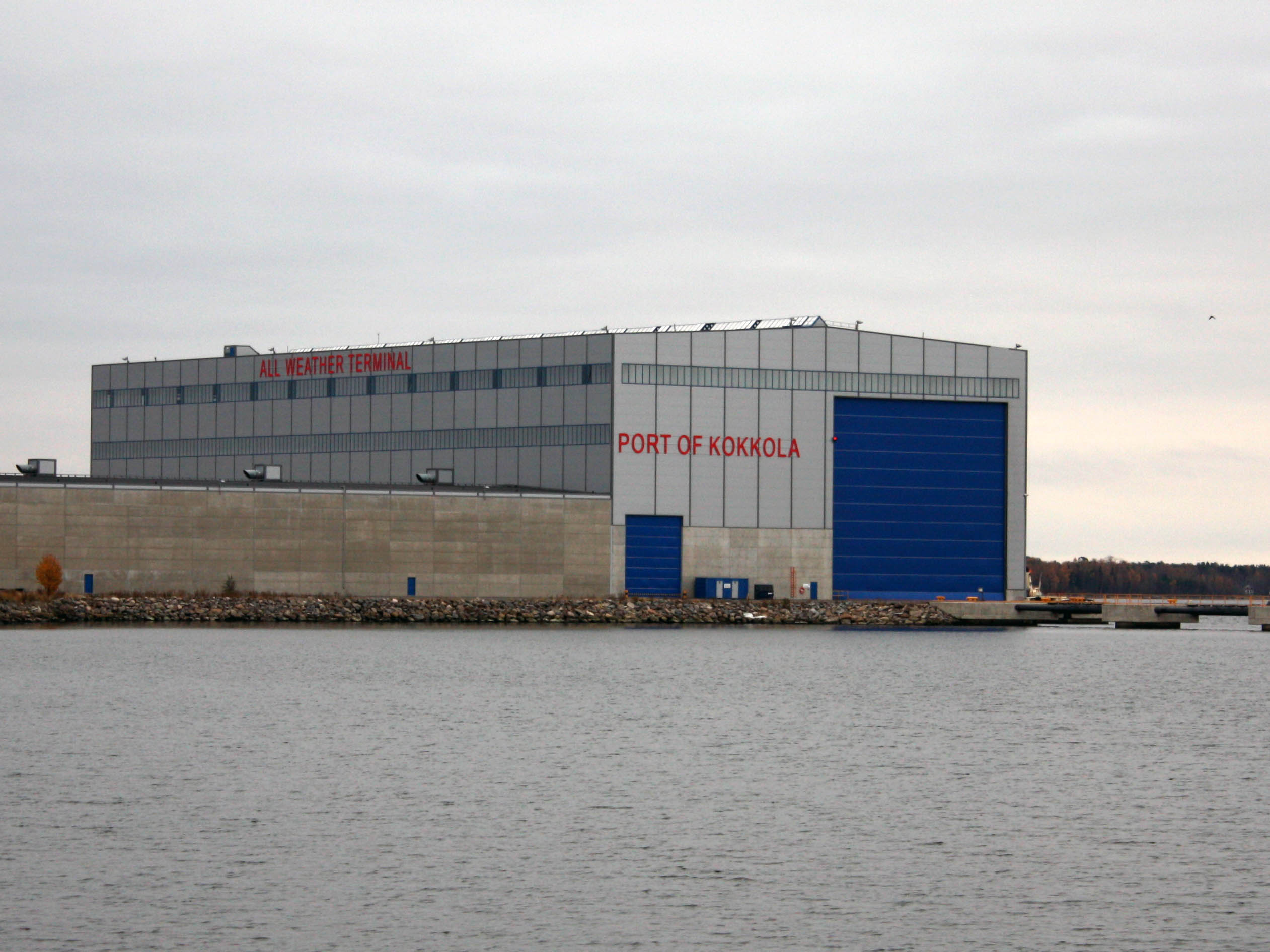
All weather terminal (AWT) of the Port of Kokkola

Kokkola is the capital and biggest city in the region of Central Ostrobothnia. The chemical industry is a major employer. An industrial area and the city's port are located in Ykspihlaja. Umicore has a cobalt plant. The Freeport/Umicore refinery is the only large cobalt refinery outside China. Boliden has a zinc plant. Kemira, a chemical conglomerate, built an industrial park that is now divided among several corporations. In addition, industries represented in the town include metalworking, casting, textiles, plastics, food and carpentry. Largest employers are as follows (2011):

- The city of Kokkola approx. 2.350
- Central Ostrobothnian Joint Municipal Authority for Social and Health Services (Soite) 2.500
- Boliden Kokkola Oy (zinc) 500
- Umicore (was Freeport Cobalt Oy until 2019) (cobalt) 420
- KPO group (retail) 400
- Halpa-Halli (retail) 300
- CABB Oy (fine chemicals) 200

The Port of Kokkola is located in Ykspihlaja, approximately 5 km (3 mi) from the city center, and it is one of the busiest ports in Finland. Oil, ore and limestone are imported, refined products and timber are exported, and iron ore is transited.

The Chydenia Shopping Center, completed in 2006, is located in the center of Kokkola; about 2 million people visit at the shopping center every year.

== Transport ==
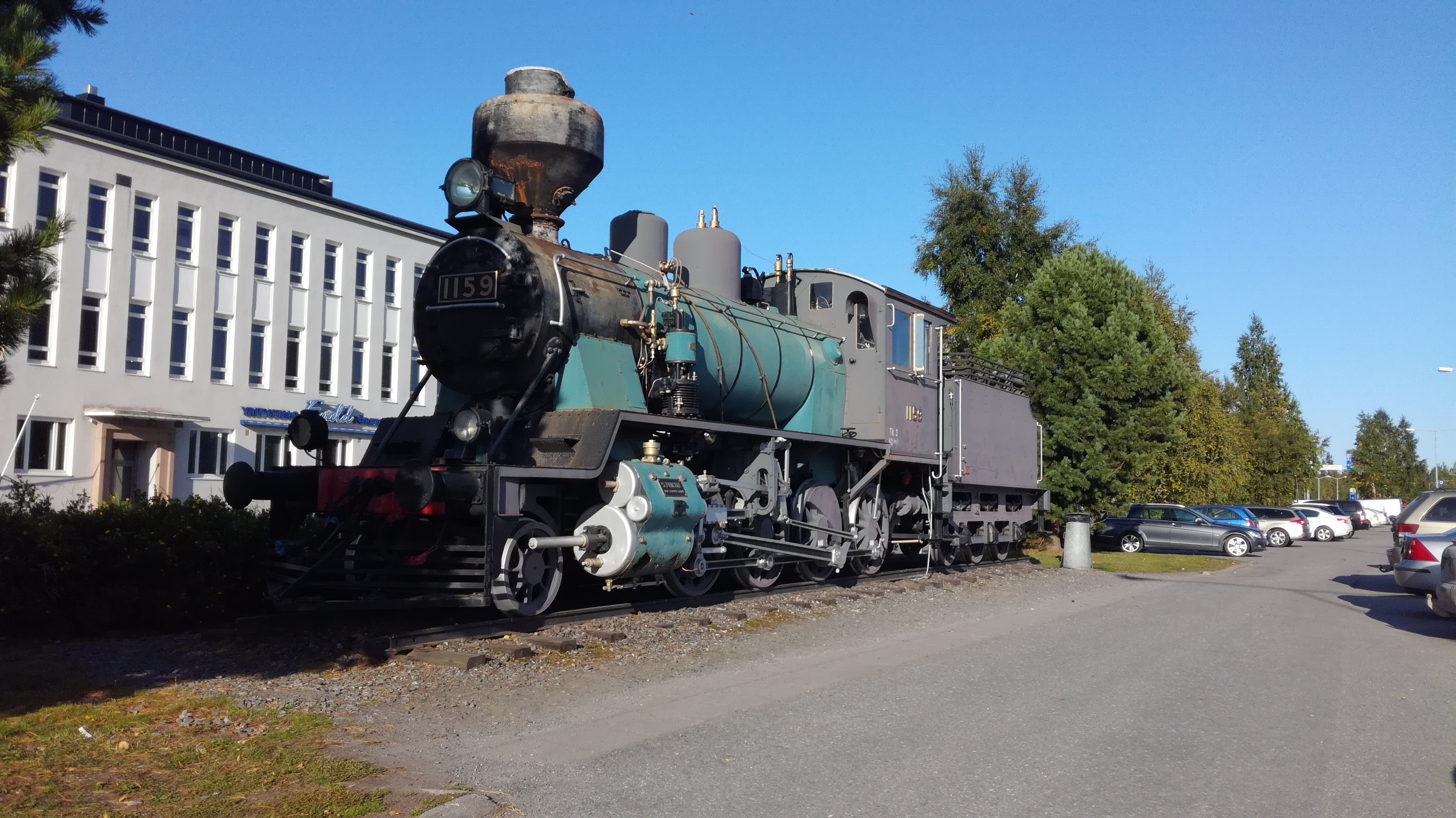
Steam locomotive VR Class Tk3 1105 at Kokkola

Kokkola is located on the coast of Gulf of Bothnia, and the coastal European route E8 (Finnish highway 8) goes through, connecting Oulu and Turku via Vaasa. Finnish highway 28 begins from Kokkola and runs to Kajaani. Finnish highway 13 begins from Kokkola and runs through Finland into the Nuijamaa border to Russia crossing via Jyväskylä and Mikkeli. The scenic '7 Bridges Archipelago Road' (road 749) runs along the coast between Kokkola and Jakobstad (Finnish: Pietarsaari).

Kokkola-Pietarsaari Airport is situated 22 kilometres (14 mi) from Kokkola in Kronoby.

The Kokkola railway station is a stop along the Seinäjoki–Oulu railway, with service between Helsinki and Kemijärvi via Tampere and Seinäjoki, where the fast Pendolino bullet train operates.

There is no passenger ferry traffic from Kokkola.

== Politics ==
Results of the 2021 Finnish municipal elections in Kokkola:

| Party | Seats |
|---|---|
| Centre Party | 10 |
| Social Democratic Party | 8 |
| True Finns | 7 |
| National Coalition Party | 6 |
| Swedish People's Party | 4 |
| Christian Democrats | 4 |
| Left Alliance | 2 |
| Green League | 2 |

== Culture and sights ==
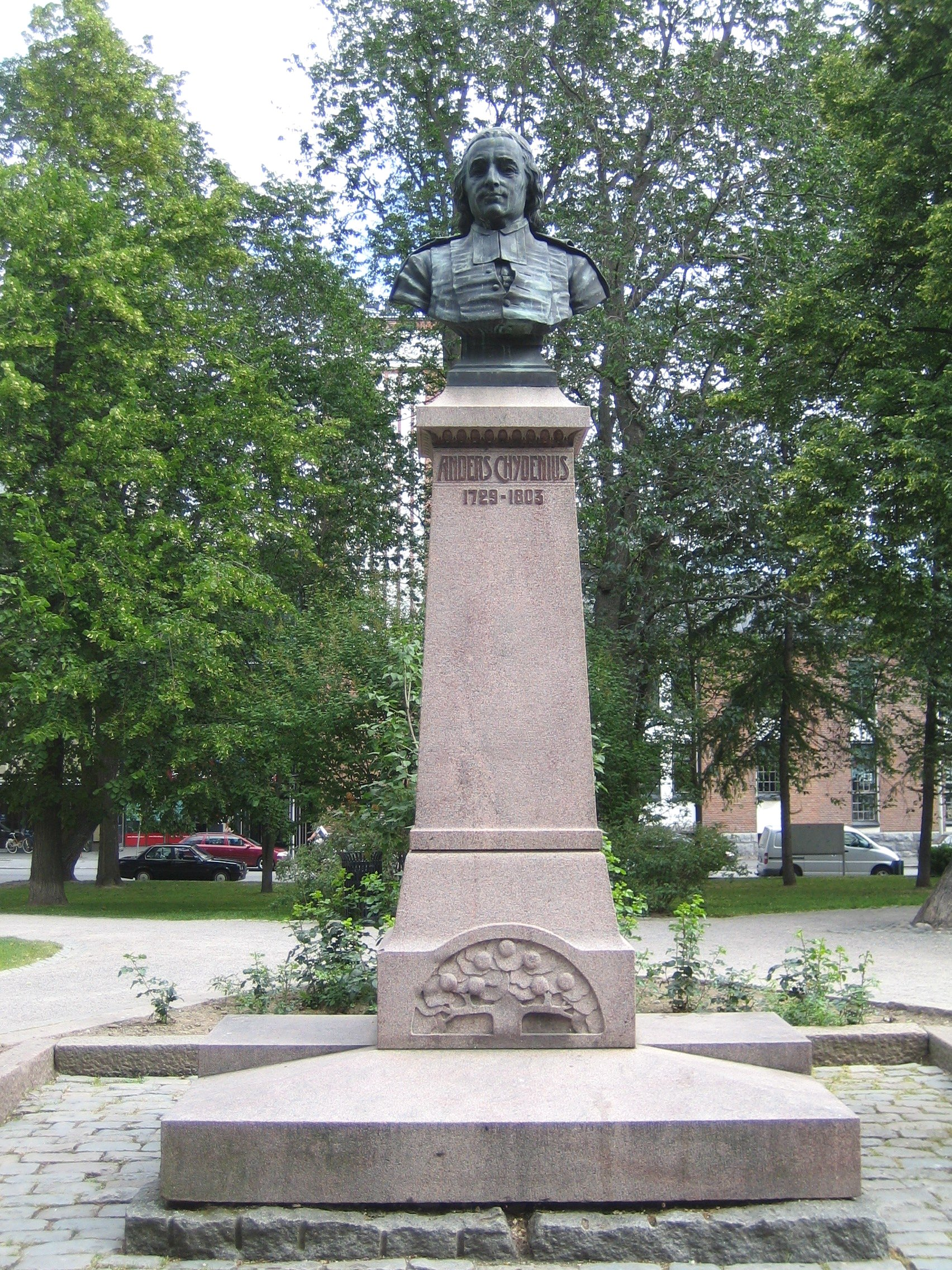
Statue of Anders Chydenius (1729–1803) in Kokkola, made by sculptor Walter Runeberg (1838–1920).

The city is the home of the world-renowned Ostrobothnian Chamber Orchestra, which was founded by the conductor Juha Kangas in 1972.

=== Buildings ===
The area of old wooden houses in the downtown area of Neristan has been the setting for the life and livelihood of its inhabitants for hundreds of years. Today these houses are offering restaurants, cafés, little shops and even accommodation for tourists.

Tankar island, a lighthouse island, is in the outer archipelago, about 18 km (11 mi) northwest from Kokkola. The island houses a lighthouse which is still in use today, a museum of seal-hunting, a bird-watching tower, a lot of nature trails and even accommodations for tourists. It is easy to reach the island by ferry m/s Jenny from Kokkola.

The stone Evangelical-Lutheran Church of Kaarlela has been a landmark since 1550 and is a popular venue for weddings and concerts. Next to the church, there is a local history museum at Kirkonmäki with an Ostrobothnian farmhouse, as well as an old smithy, a tannery, a wool-carding workshop, a threshing barn, a smoke sauna, a granary barn and a loft.

K. H. Renlund Museum is devoted to Karl Herman Renlund, who donated his large art collection to the town of Kokkola. The museum houses some temporary exhibitions and the museum shop. Next to the museum is the Pedagogio, a school-house, which is Finland's oldest urban secular wooden building (built in 1696). In this quarter, there is also the Lassander House which offers a glimpse into a merchant home in the 18th century.

=== Sport ===
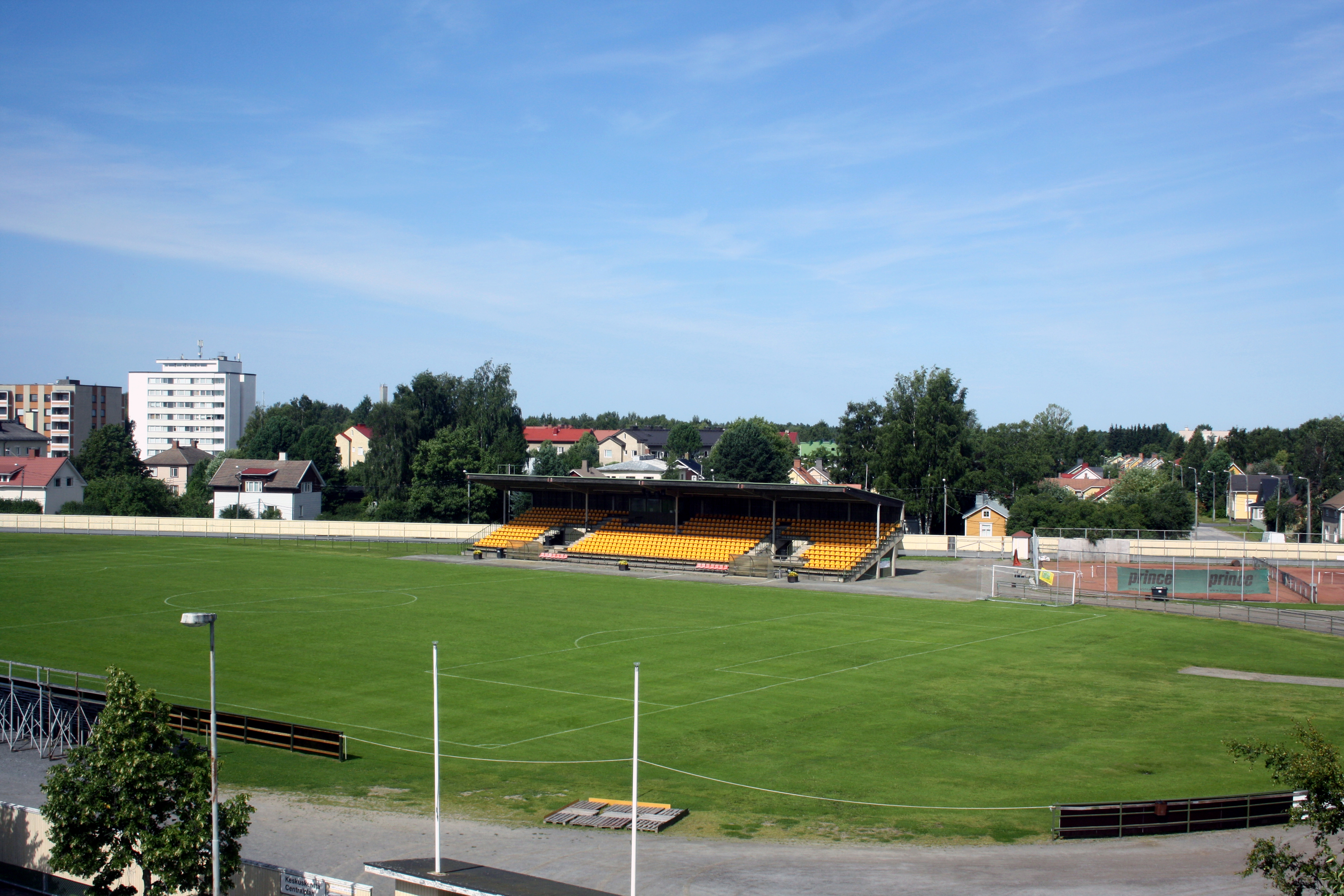
Kokkola sports field

During the winter time, Kokkola offers 20 skiing tracks with a total length of 150 km (93 mi). Kokkola is the home of the ice hockey club Hermes, which plays in the second highest Finnish league (mestis). Moreover, there are the soccer clubs Kokkolan Palloveikot (KPV), which plays in the second highest Finnish league (Ykkönen) and Gamlakarleby Bollklubb (GBK), which plays in the third highest Finnish league (Kakkonen). Kokkola's volleyball team Kokkolan Tiikerit is active in the highest Finnish volleyball league and current Finnish champions for men (Lentopallon Mestaruusliiga). Sailing clubs include Gamlakarleby Segelförening, Kokkolan Purjehtijat and Kokkolan venekerho. There is also an american football team Karleby Goats, which plays in the third highest Finnish american football league (Amerikkalaisen jalkapallon II-divisioona).

== Education ==
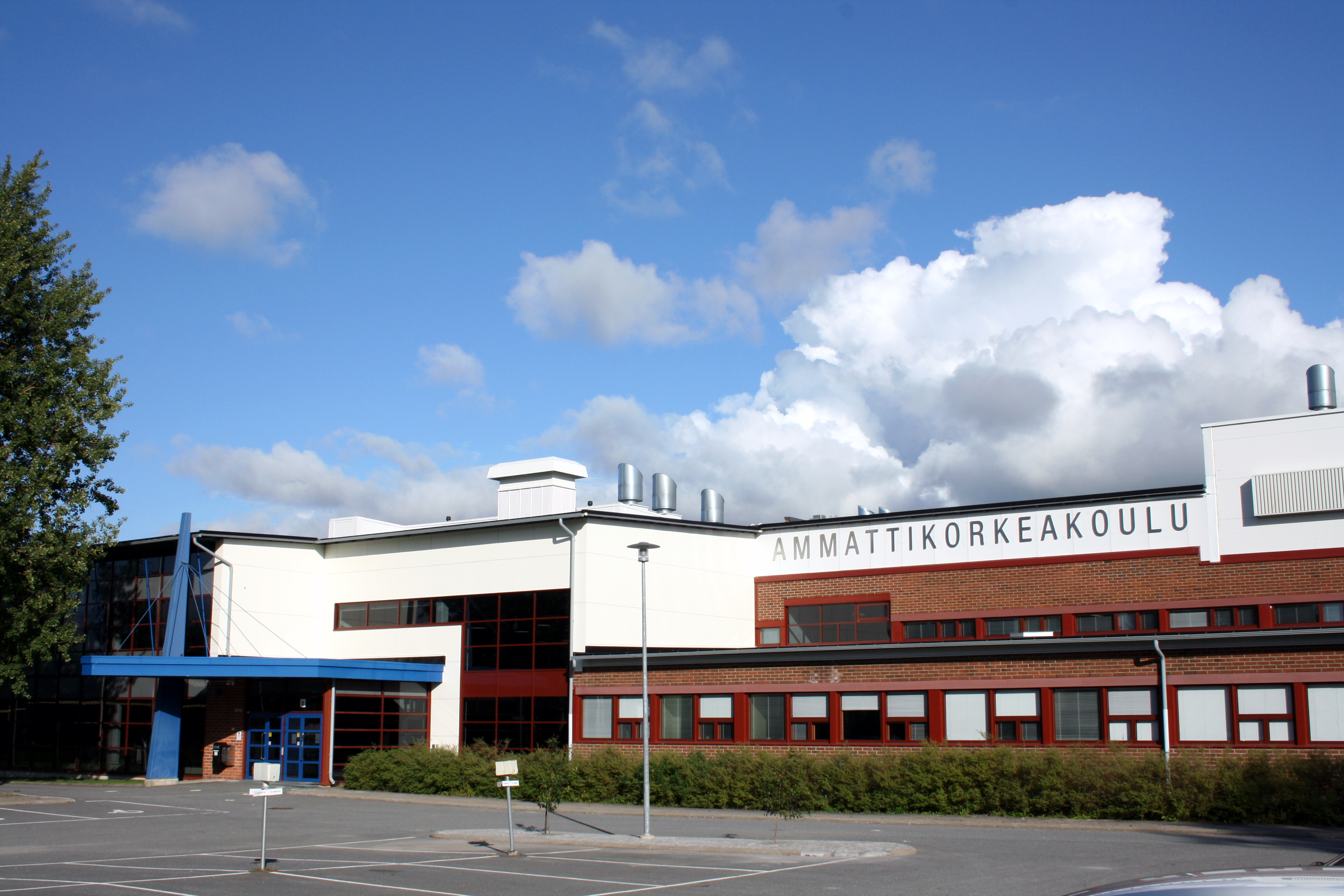
Centria University of Applied Sciences

Kokkola has a lot of preschools; some of them offer children a bilingual education from an early age (mostly Finnish-English or Finnish-Swedish). There are 25 Finnish-speaking and 8 Swedish-speaking schools. Moreover, there are three secondary schools for Finnish-speaking pupils and one for Swedish-speaking. Some schools offer a dual vocational education and training.

The Chydenius-Institution of Kokkola, a university consortium, carries out teaching and research under the auspices of the University of Jyväskylä, University of Oulu, and University of Vaasa. It is specialized in adult education. For Finnish and foreign students it arranges open university studies, further education for professionals in the fields of education, social services and health services and management.

Centria University of Applied Sciences [Finnish name: Centria ammattikorkeakoulu] (UAS), a polytechnic, has three campuses, one of which is in Kokkola (the other two campuses are in Ylivieska and Pietarsaari).

== Notable people ==
- Anders Chydenius (1729–1803), Lutheran priest and member of the Swedish Riksdag
- Otto Donner (1835–1909), linguist, professor, and politician
- Juho Kuosmanen (born 1979), film director and screenwriter
- Joonas Sammalmaa (born 1991), professional ice hockey player
- Teemu Wirkkala (born 1984), professional javelin thrower.

== International relations ==
=== Twin towns – sister cities ===
Kokkola is twinned with 15 cities:

- Härnösand, Sweden
- Mörbylånga, Sweden
- Ullånger, Sweden
- Averøy, Norway
- Kristiansund, Norway
- Fredericia, Denmark
- Ambla, Estonia
- Järva-Jaani, Estonia
- Marijampolė, Lithuania
- Boldog, Hungary
- Hatvan, Hungary
- Ratingen, Germany
- Fitchburg, United States
- Greater Sudbury, Canada
- Fushun, China

== See also ==
- Nykarleby
- Såka
