= Joonas Sammalmaa =

Finnish ice hockey player

- Born: January 18, 1991 (age 35) Kokkola, Finland
- Height: 5 ft 8 in (173 cm)
- Weight: 163 lb (74 kg; 11 st 9 lb)
- Position: Left wing
- Shoots: Right
- SM-liiga team: JYP Jyväskylä
- NHL draft: Undrafted
- Playing career: 2011–present

Joonas Sammalmaa (born January 18, 1991) is a Finnish professional ice hockey player. He is currently playing for JYP Jyväskylä of the SM-liiga.

Sammalmaa made his SM-liiga debut playing with JYP Jyväskylä during the 2012–13 SM-liiga season.
