= European Journal of Physiotherapy =

- Discipline: Physiotherapy
- Language: English
- Edited by: Gunnevi Sundelin

Publication details
- Former name(s): Advances in Physiotherapy
- History: 1999–present
- Publisher: Taylor & Francis
- Frequency: Quarterly

Standard abbreviations
- ISO 4: Eur. J. Physiother.

Indexing
- ISSN: 2167-9169 (print); 2167-9177 (web)
- OCLC no.: 794175501

Links
- Journal homepage; Online access; Online archive

The European Journal of Physiotherapy is a quarterly peer-reviewed medical journal covering physiotherapy. It was established in 1999 as Advances in Physiotherapy, obtaining its current name in 2013. It is published by Taylor & Francis and the editor in chief is Gunnevi Sundelin (Umeå University).

== Abstracting and indexing ==
The journal is abstracted and indexed in CINAHL, Excerpta Medica/Embase, and Scopus.
