= Joonas Koskinen =

Finnish ice hockey player

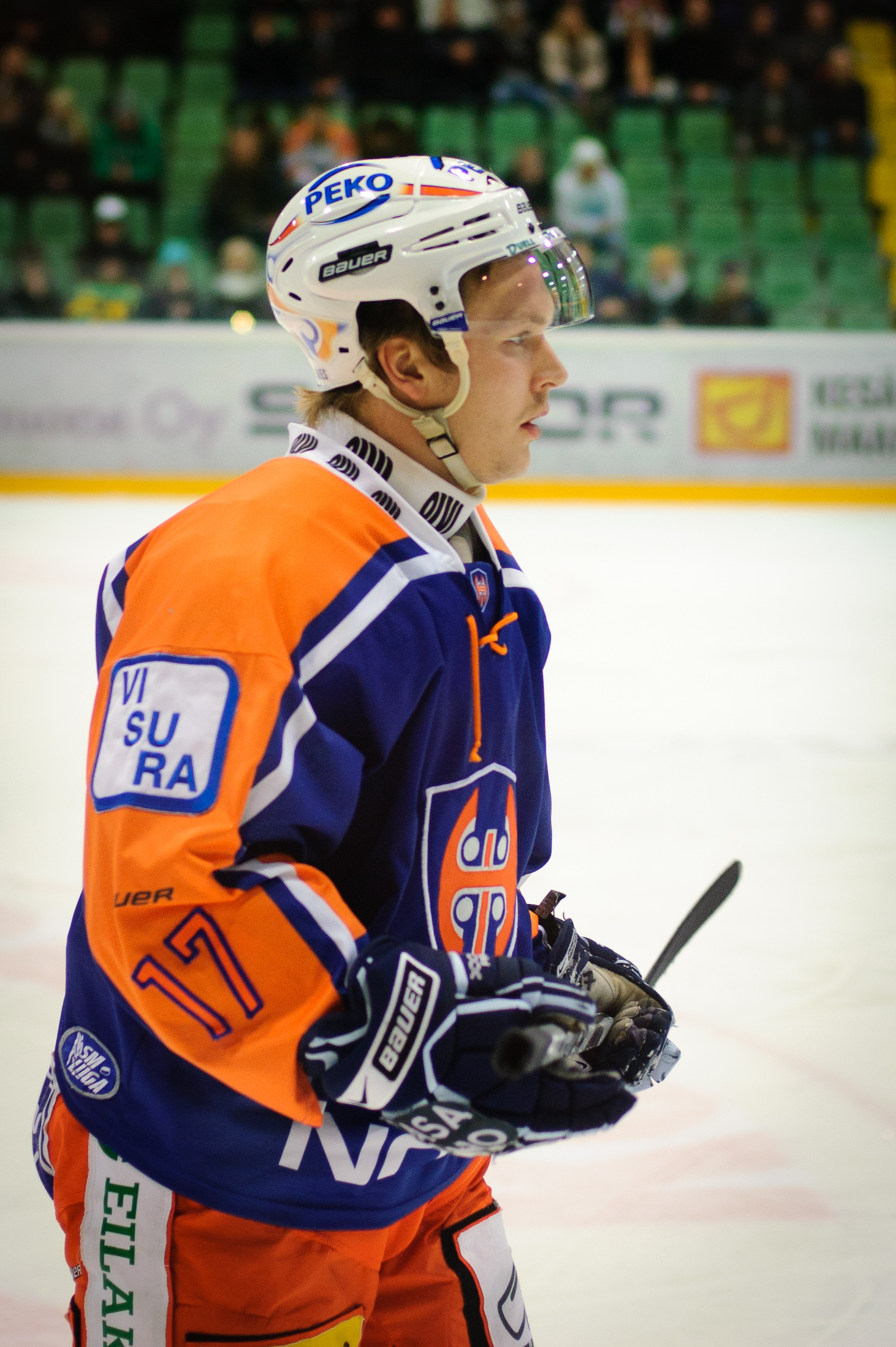
- Born: March 8, 1987 (age 38); Ruovesi, Finland
- Height: 5 ft 10 in (178 cm)
- Weight: 181 lb (82 kg; 12 st 13 lb)
- Position: Centre
- Shoots: Left
- Mestis team Former teams: Lempäälän Kisa; Tappara (SM-liiga); HK Poprad
- NHL draft: Undrafted
- Playing career: 2008–present

Joonas Koskinen (born March 8, 1987) is a Finnish professional ice hockey player. He currently plays for Lempäälän Kisa of the Finnish Mestis.

Koskinen made his SM-liiga debut playing with Tappara during the 2009–10 SM-liiga season.

== Career statistics ==
			Regular season					Playoffs
Season	Team	League	GP	G	A	Pts	PIM	GP	G	A	Pts	PIM
2001–02	Tappara U16	U16 SM-sarja	14	5	7	12	2	2	2	1	3	2
2002–03	Tappara U16	U16 SM-sarja	13	14	5	19	24	—	—	—	—	—
2002–03	Tappara U18	U18 SM-sarja	13	1	1	2	4	—	—	—	—	—
2003–04	Tappara U18	U18 SM-sarja	14	5	8	13	6	—	—	—	—	—
2003–04	Tappara U20	U20 SM-liiga	17	1	2	3	6	4	0	0	0	0
2004–05	Tappara U18	U18 SM-sarja	8	3	4	7	2	2	1	1	2	0
2004–05	Tappara U20	U20 SM-liiga	33	4	7	11	6	1	0	0	0	0
2005–06	Tappara U20	U20 SM-liiga	11	2	0	2	2	—	—	—	—	—
2005–06	HPK U20	U20 SM-liiga	28	9	11	20	12	3	0	0	0	0
2006–07	Tappara U20	U20 SM-liiga	41	15	22	37	26	10	3	3	6	20
2007–08	Tappara U20	U20 SM-liiga	47	18	25	43	20	3	0	0	0	6
2008–09	Hokki	Mestis	44	7	19	26	8	11	4	1	5	6
2009–10	Tappara	SM-liiga	55	10	7	17	22	4	0	2	2	0
2010–11	Tappara	SM-liiga	55	4	7	11	14	—	—	—	—	—
2010–11	LeKi	Mestis	2	0	0	0	0	—	—	—	—	—
2011–12	Jokipojat	Mestis	14	3	8	11	2	—	—	—	—	—
2011–12	HK Poprad	Slovak	27	9	15	24	14	6	0	3	3	4
2012–13	HK Poprad	Slovak	32	2	7	9	10	—	—	—	—	—
2012–13	Beibarys Atyrau	Kazakhstan	6	3	2	5	4	14	6	2	8	4
2013–14	Mikkelin Jukurit	Mestis	43	7	13	20	10	—	—	—	—	—
2013–14	LeKi	Mestis	5	0	2	2	0	—	—	—	—	—
2014–15	Olofströms IK	Hockeyettan	17	5	10	15	20	—	—	—	—	—
2014–15	ERC Sonthofen 1999	Germany3	8	2	7	9	4	—	—	—	—	—
2014–15	Aalborg Pirates	Denmark	8	2	1	3	0	4	0	0	0	6
2015–16	Vimmerby HC	Hockeyettan	34	5	23	28	24	—	—	—	—	—
2016–17	Hudiksvalls HC	Hockeyettan	40	9	34	43	22	—	—	—	—	—
2017–18	Hudiksvalls HC	Hockeyettan	36	9	17	26	18	—	—	—	—	—
2018–19	Vire	2. Divisioona	6	0	6	6	0	—	—	—	—	—
SM-liiga totals			110	14	14	28	36	—	—	—	—	—
Mestis totals			108	17	42	59	20	11	4	1	5	6
Hockeyettan totals			127	28	84	112	84	4	0	0	0	0
Slovak totals			59	11	22	33	24	6	0	3	3	0
