= Väino Ilus =

Estonian writer (born 1929)

Väino Ilus (born 8 December 1929) is an Estonian writer. He was born in Viljandi.

From 1949 to 1953, he worked as a journalist. From 1961 to 1981, he was member of the editorial office of the journal Looming. Since 1958, he was a member of Estonian Writers' Union.

== Works ==
- 1965: short stoy collection "Muutlike ilmade ajal" ('A Time of Changeable Weather')
- 1968: novel "Tuulekülvid" ('Sowings of the Wind')
- 1978: novel "Kinsli peremehed ('The Masters of Kinsli')
