= Glenn Rönnberg =

Swedish footballer

Personal information
- Full name: Glenn Olof Rönnberg
- Date of birth: 9 May 1961 (age 65)
- Place of birth: Stockholm, Sweden
- Height: 1.82 m (5 ft 11 1/2 in)
- Position: Midfielder

Youth career
- 1972–1978: Älvsjö AIK

Senior career*
Years	Team	Apps	(Gls)
1979–1982	AIK Fotboll	41	(3)
1983	Tramway GoIF		
1984–1985	IFK Västerås		
1986–1987	Västerås SK		
1988–1993	IFK Eskilstuna		
1994	Huvudsta IS		

Managerial career
- 1993–1994: Östermalms IF
- * Club domestic league appearances and goals

Glenn Olof Rönnberg is a Swedish former footballer who played as a left-back, midfielder and a forward, starting his career at AIK Fotboll. He is the brother of fellow footballer Mikael Rönnberg.
