= Mikael Rönnberg =

Swedish footballer

Personal information
- Full name: Hans Mikael Rönnberg
- Date of birth: 6 February 1957 (age 69)
- Place of birth: Stockholm, Sweden
- Height: 1.84 m (6 ft 0 in)
- Position: Midfielder

Youth career
- 1975–1976: Hammarby IF

Senior career*
Years	Team	Apps	(Gls)
1976–1982	Hammarby	96	(8)
1982–1985	Malmö	64	(20)
1984–1985	Dallas Sidekicks (indoor)	33	(2)
1985–1986	Gefle	18	(4)
1986–1987	Trelleborg	9	(0)
1987	AEL	9	(1)
1987–1990	Hammarby	34	(2)

International career
1979–1981	Sweden	6	(1)
- * Club domestic league appearances and goals

Hans Mikael Rönnberg (born 6 February 1957) is a Swedish former footballer who played as a midfielder for several Swedish clubs, mostly for Hammarby IF, and the Greek club AEL.

== Personal life ==
He is the brother of fellow footballer Glenn Rönnberg.

== International career ==
Rönnberg represented Sweden from 1979 to 1981 for 6 times and scored his only international goal against Norway in a 4–2 victory in February 1981.
