= Matti Kuusela =

Finnish journalist

Matti Kuusela (born 12 June 1956) is a retired Finnish journalist. He worked for Aamulehti for nearly 40 years. Kuusela received many journalism awards in his career. In 2024, Kuusela revealed in his autobiography, that he has written self-invented material in his articles.

== Career ==
Kuusela started his career in 1981 and worked as a regular journalist for Aamulehti from 1983 to 2020, when he retired. After this, Kuusela worked as an occasional assistant for Iltalehti. Kuusela worked as a sports reporter, editor of the Sunday pages and from 2000 as a culture journalist.

For the majority of his career, Kuusela has worked with narrative journalism and reportages, travelogues, personal interviews and columns, among other things. He has received several important awards during his career, such as the Tiedonjulkistamisen valtionpalkinto, Lumilapio-award for investigative journalism, Best newspaper story of the year award by Sanomalehtien Liitto and Bonnier's best newspaper story award. Kuusela was especially known for his reportage trips abroad, which he made to Asia, the Middle East, Russia and Ukraine. Kuusela worked as a Beijing correspondent for six months in 2004.

Kuusela lives in Nokia with his wife. They have 2 adult kids.

== Disclosure of fictitious interviews ==
In March 2024, it was revealed that Kuusela had written fabrications in some of his interviews with Aamulehti. He admitted in his biography Journalisti – Toisenlainen toimittaja that he used fiction in some of his articles. After the book was published, Aamulehti removed 551 articles written by Kuusela and launched an internal investigation. The investigation stated that Kuusela had used fiction in several articles written at different times. Determining the total amount is difficult.

Kuusela denies that he distorted the statements of the interviewees. He says that he used exaggeration, sarcasm and amusement as stylistic devices. According to Kuusela, readers should understand that not all articles are completely true. A complaint has been made to the Council for Mass Media in Finland.

Matti Apunen was the editor-in-chief of Aamulehti between 1998 and 2010. He has defended Kuusela's experimental style and has said he understands the context in which the stories have been published. Apunen says that there should be room for experimentation and play in journalism, as long as the context is clear. According to Apunen, the limits are absolute in news articles, but an experimental body text is a different matter.

In May 2023, Iltalehti had to remove 33 articles about the Russian invasion of Ukraine from its website. The magazine's investigation raised unethical concerns in the assistant's activities, such as the misuse of images at different times and places. This also raised doubts about the truthfulness of the information in other stories.
