= Cognitive hearing science =

Field of science

Cognitive hearing science is an interdisciplinary science field concerned with the physiological and cognitive basis of hearing and its interplay with signal processing in hearing aids. The field includes genetics, physiology, medical and technical audiology, cognitive neuroscience, cognitive psychology, linguistics and social psychology.

Theoretically the research in cognitive hearing science combines a physiological model for the information transfer from the outer auditory organ to the auditory cerebral cortex, and a cognitive model for how language comprehension is influenced by the interplay between the incoming language signal and the individual's cognitive skills, especially the long-term memory and the working memory.

Researchers examine the interplay between type of hearing impairment or deafness, type of signal processing in different hearing aids, type of listening environment and the individual's cognitive skills.

Research in cognitive hearing science has importance for the knowledge about different types of hearing impairment and its effects, as for the possibilities to determine which individuals can make use of a certain type of signal processing in hearing aid or cochlear implant and thereby adapt hearing aid to the individual.

Cognitive hearing science has been introduced by researchers at the Linköping University research centre Linnaeus Centre HEAD (HEaring And Deafness) in Sweden, created in 2008 with a major 10-year grant from the Swedish Research Council.

== Resources ==
- Linnaeus Centre HEAD
- Interview, prof. Jerker Rönnberg
