= Joonas Liimatainen =

Finnish ice hockey player

- Born: July 4, 1991 (age 35) Tampere, Finland
- Height: 6 ft 2 in (188 cm)
- Weight: 236 lb (107 kg; 16 st 12 lb)
- Position: Defence
- Shoots: Left
- EIHL team: Cardiff Devils
- Playing career: 2009–present

Joonas Liimatainen (born July 4, 1991) is a Finnish professional ice hockey player who played with the Cardiff Devils in the EIHL during the 2013–14 season.

Liimatainen signed a one-month trial contract with the Devils on November 19, 2013.
