= Joonas Rönnberg =

Finnish ice hockey player

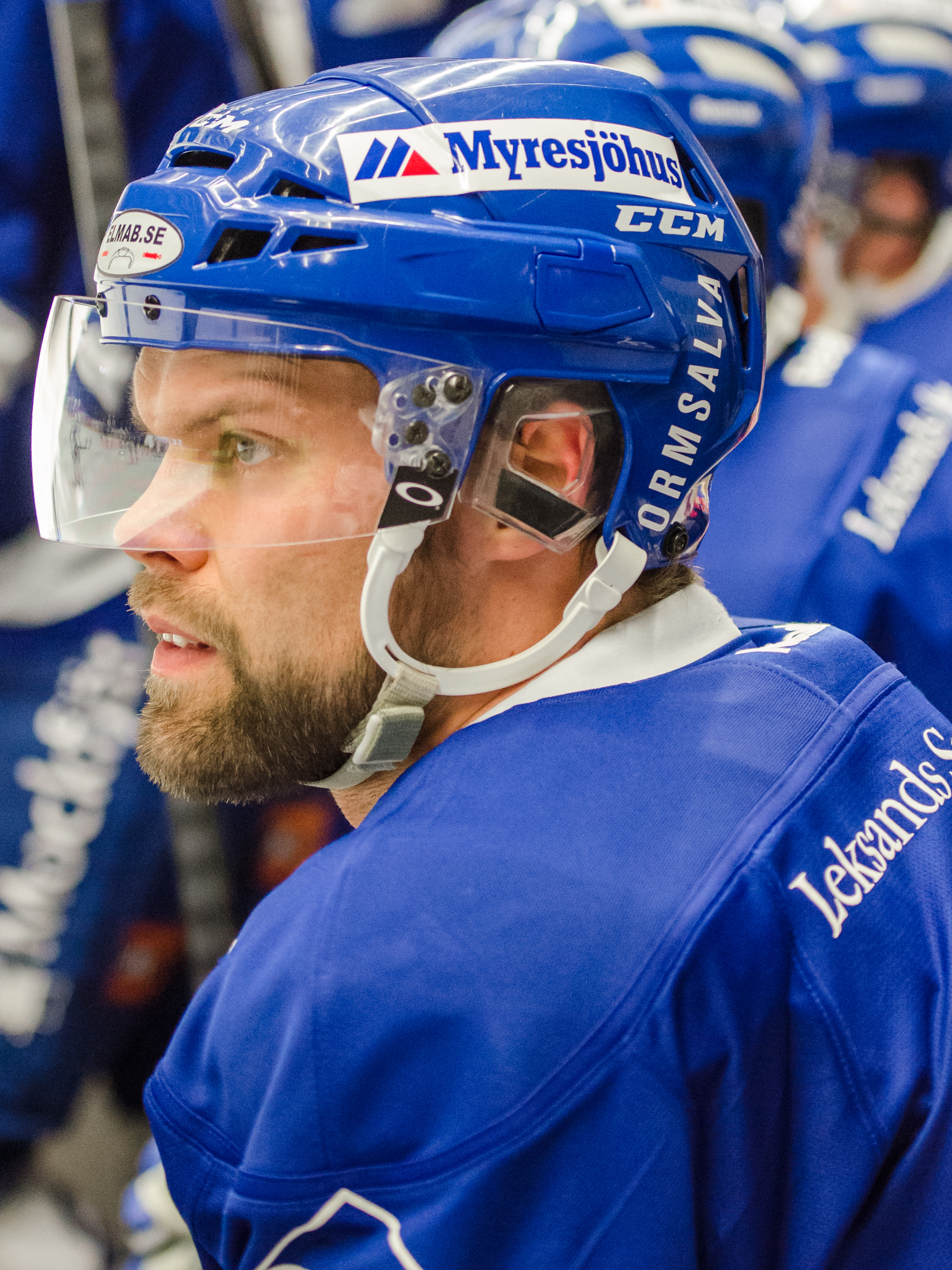
- Born: February 19, 1983 (age 42); Vantaa, Finland
- Height: 6 ft 3 in (191 cm)
- Weight: 218 lb (99 kg; 15 st 8 lb)
- Position: Defence
- Shoots: Left
- III-Div team Former teams: HC Ludwig: Ilves Tampere; SaiPa; Espoo Blues; Leksands IF; Düsseldorfer EG; Storhamar; Sheffield Steelers
- Playing career: 2002–present

Joonas Rönnberg (born February 19, 1983) is a Finnish professional ice hockey defenceman. He currently plays for HC Ludwig in Vantaa, Finland. He previously played for Sheffield Steelers of the UK's Elite Ice Hockey League (EIHL).

Rönnberg made his Swedish Hockey League debut playing with Leksands IF during the 2013–14 SHL season. After four seasons with Leksands, Ronnberg left as a free agent to sign a one-year contract in Germany with Düsseldorfer EG of the DEL on May 26, 2015.

In June 2017, Rönnberg moved to the UK to sign for EIHL side the Sheffield Steelers on a one-year contract.
