= Joonas Toivanen =

Finnish ice hockey player

- Born: April 2, 1991 (age 34) Varkaus, Finland
- Height: 6 ft 2 in (188 cm)
- Weight: 192 lb (87 kg; 13 st 10 lb)
- Position: Centre
- Shot: Left
- Played for: Warkis; KalPa; SaPKo; TUTO Hockey; Espoo United; Kiekko-Espoo; Black Dragons Erfurt
- NHL draft: Undrafted
- Playing career: 2010–2021

Joonas Toivanen (born April 2, 1991) is a Finnish professional ice hockey player who is currently playing for Espoo United (ice hockey) in the Mestis.

== Career statistics ==
			Regular season					Playoffs
Season	Team	League	GP	G	A	Pts	PIM	GP	G	A	Pts	PIM
2006–07	Warkis U16	U16 SM-sarja Q	11	6	9	15	18	—	—	—	—	—
2006–07	Warkis U16	U16 I-Divisioona	13	13	10	23	10	3	0	3	3	2
2006–07	Warkis	2. Divisioona	3	2	2	4	2	—	—	—	—	—
2007–08	KalPa U18	U18 SM-sarja	35	6	20	26	55	2	0	1	1	2
2008–09	KalPa U18	U18 SM-sarja Q	8	4	8	12	10	—	—	—	—	—
2008–09	KalPa U18	U18 SM-sarja	20	10	18	28	59	2	0	1	1	2
2008–09	KalPa U20	U20 SM-liiga	2	0	0	0	0	—	—	—	—	—
2009–10	KalPa U20	U20 SM-liiga	37	5	10	15	20	3	0	1	1	2
2010–11	KalPa U20	U20 SM-liiga	41	6	25	31	36	—	—	—	—	—
2010–11	KalPa	SM-liiga	2	0	0	0	0	—	—	—	—	—
2011–12	SaPKo U20	U20 I-Divisioona Q	1	1	0	1	0	—	—	—	—	—
2011–12	SaPKo	Mestis	39	3	5	8	20	5	0	1	1	2
2012–13	SaPKo	Mestis	44	9	17	26	40	—	—	—	—	—
2013–14	SaPKo	Mestis	54	7	16	23	40	—	—	—	—	—
2014–15	SaPKo	Mestis	50	8	18	26	50	7	1	3	4	6
2015–16	SaPKo	Mestis	44	10	23	33	20	5	0	2	2	2
2016–17	TUTO Hockey	Mestis	50	7	11	18	28	11	2	2	4	12
2017–18	Espoo United	Mestis	49	9	16	25	26	—	—	—	—	—
2018–19	SaPKo	Mestis	46	4	20	24	69	4	0	0	0	4
2019–20	Kiekko-Espoo	Suomi-sarja	3	2	1	3	2	—	—	—	—	—
2019–20	Black Dragons Erfurt	Germany3	38	17	14	31	54	—	—	—	—	—
2020–21	Warkis	2. Divisioona	9	8	16	24	6	—	—	—	—	—
SM-liiga totals			2	0	0	0	0	—	—	—	—	—
Mestis totals			376	57	126	183	293	32	3	8	11	26
