= Joonas Vaino =

Estonian basketball player

Personal information
- Born: 22 April 1992 (age 34) Rakvere, Estonia
- Listed height: 6 ft 8 in (2.03 m)
- Listed weight: 240 lb (109 kg)

Career information
- Playing career: 2008–present
- Position: Power forward
- Number: 12

Career history
- 2008–2009: Rakvere Tarvas
- 2009–2010: Lappeenrannan NMKY
- 2010–2012: Rakvere Tarvas
- 2012–2013: Namika Lahti

Career highlights
- Estonian Basketball Cup; Runner-up: (2011)
Medals
Representing Estonia
Men's basketball
FIBA U20 European Championship
Silver medal – second place	2011 Bosnia and Herzegovina	National team

Joonas Vaino (born 22 April 1992) is an Estonian professional basketball player. He is currently playing for Finnish club Namika Lahti at the power forward position.

== Club career ==
Joonas Vaino came through youth ranks to play first-tier basketball for BC Rakvere Tarvas and made his debut in KML when he was 16 years old. In his first year, he spent most of the time on the bench, because his season was marred with injuries. The following season he joined Korisliiga team LrNMKY though, where he stayed for a season. He rejoined the hometown team which had reached the finals during his Finnish year, and played there for two seasons. Since 2012, he has been playing with Namika Lahti.

== International career ==
Vaino has been a member of many youth national teams with his native Estonia. With U20 team, they managed to get promotion to the FIBA Europe Under-20 Championship A division, defeating Belgium U20 on their way to the final, but lost to Georgian team.

== Honours ==
- Korvpalli Meistriliiga
  - 3rd place: 2011–12
- Estonian Basketball Cup
  - Runner-up: 2010–11
  - 3rd place: 2011–12
- BBL Challenge Cup
  - Runner-up: 2011–12
