= Joonas Kuusela =

Finnish ice hockey player

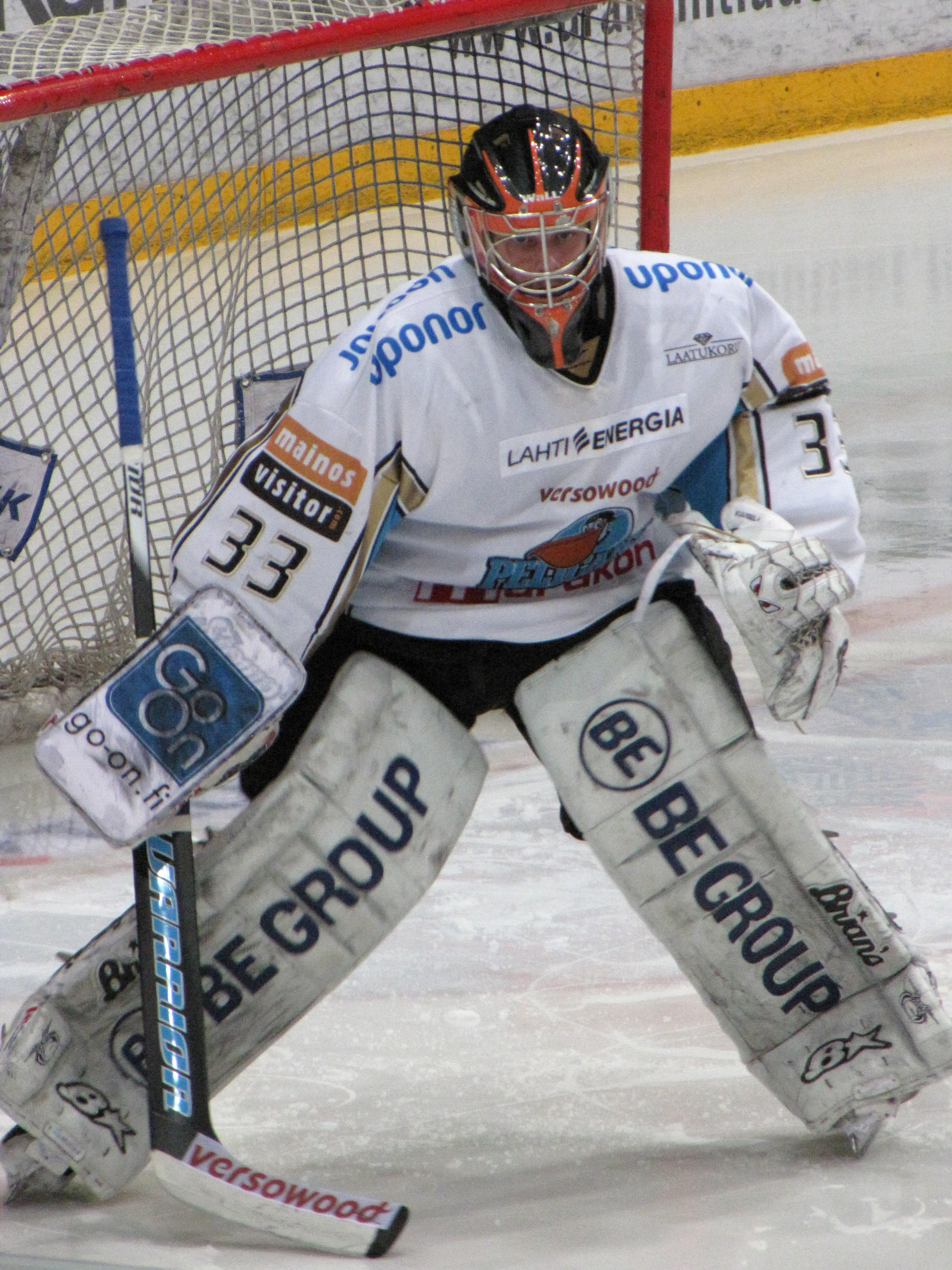
- Born: 30 May 1990 (age 34); Espoo, Finland
- Height: 6 ft 0 in (183 cm)
- Weight: 167 lb (76 kg; 11 st 13 lb)
- Position: Goaltender
- Caught: Left
- Played for: Pelicans
- NHL draft: Undrafted
- Playing career: 2008–2017

Joonas Kuusela (born 30 May 1990) is a Finnish former professional ice hockey goaltender who played for the Pelicans of the SM-liiga in his native country Finland.
