= Joonas Valkonen =

Finnish ice hockey player

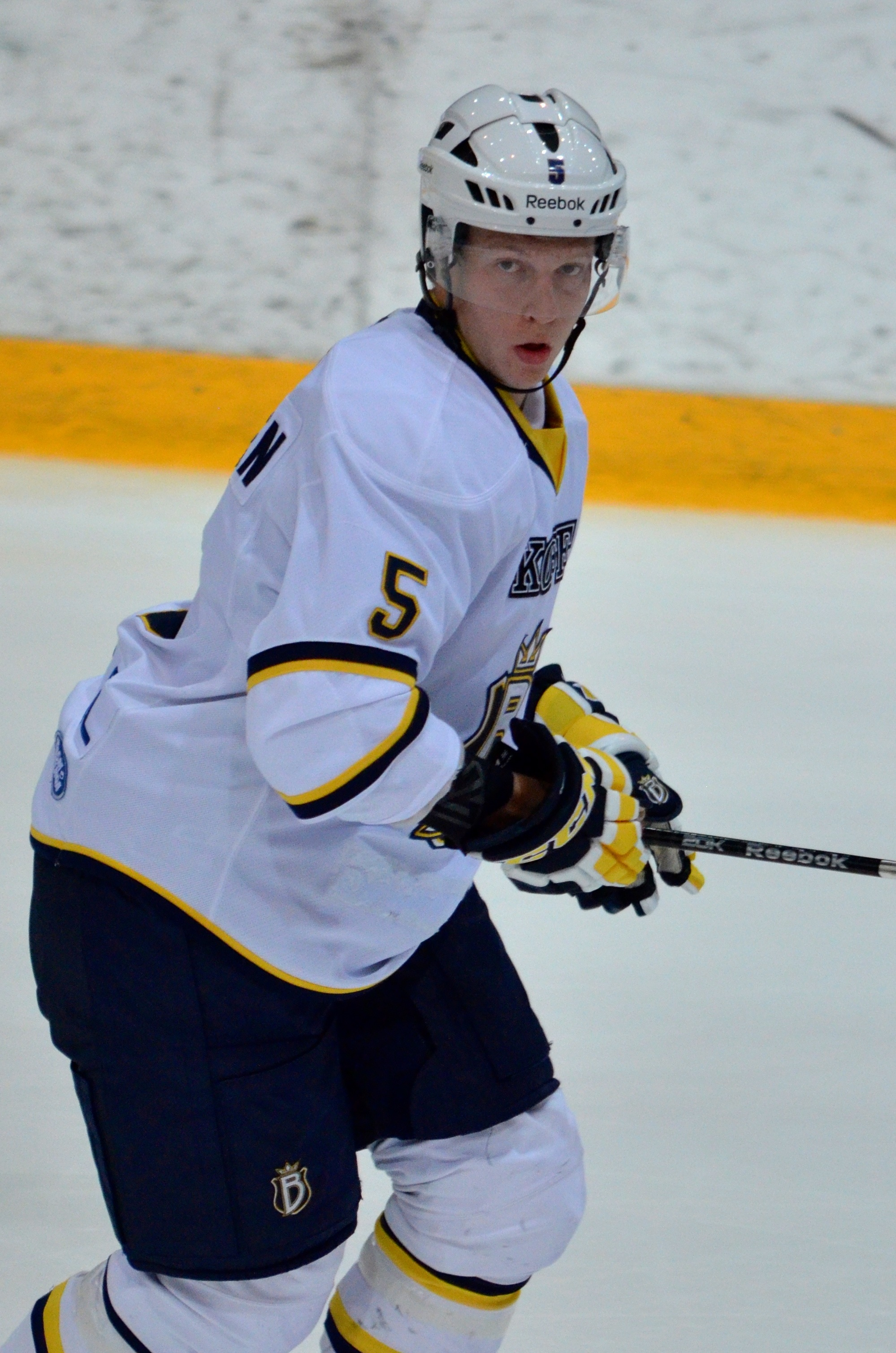
- Born: June 3, 1993 (age 31); Vantaa, Finland
- Height: 6 ft 2 in (188 cm)
- Weight: 190 lb (86 kg; 13 st 8 lb)
- Position: Defence
- Shoots: Left
- HockeyAllsvenskan team Former teams: Tingsryds AIF; Espoo Blues; Vaasan Sport; Mikkelin Jukurit
- Playing career: 2011–present

Joonas Valkonen (born June 3, 1993) is a Finnish professional ice hockey defenceman. He is currently playing with Tingsryds AIF in the Swedish HockeyAllsvenskan.

Valkonen made his SM-liiga debut playing with Espoo Blues during the 2011–12 SM-liiga season. He has also played for Vaasan Sport and Mikkelin Jukurit.
