= Panu Kuusela =

Finnish footballer (born 1979)

Panu Kuusela (born 2 April 1979) is a Finnish former professional footballer who played as a defender. He played professionally for FC Viikingit and RoPS.
