= Jonathan Sweet =

Australian actor

- Born: John Owen Marriott Sweet; 6 December 1946 (age 79); Calcutta, India
- Occupation: Actor
- Years active: 1966–2005
- Known for: Quigley Down Under (1990); Riptide (1969); Jonah (1982); Anzacs (1985)

Jonathan Sweet (born 6 December 1946) is an Australian film, television and theatre actor.

== Career ==
Sweet's career on Australian television began when he landed a co-starring role as Neal Winton in 1969 adventure TV series Riptide, an Australian production starring American actor Ty Hardin as Moss Andrews, the owner of a charter boat. He also played the part of Stephen Quinney in the ABC series Bellbird.

In 1969 Sweet left Australia to pursue acting overseas in Britain, Europe, Canada and Argentina. His overseas credits during that time include war drama series Pathfinders (1972), sci-fi series Moonbase 3 (1973) and drama anthology series Play for Today.

He returned to Australia in 1980 and appeared in long-running soap opera The Restless Years and short-lived series Sporting Chance (1981).

In 1982, Sweet got his big break playing the title role in miniseries Jonah, the story of an old hunchback living in Sydney at the turn of the century, based on the novel of the same name by Louis Stone.

Sweet played Kenneth Oakley in legal series Carson's Law in 1984 for 5 episodes. He was then cast in the 1985 war miniseries Anzacs, portraying Private Bill Harris, a former British soldier who had absconded from Afghanistan to Australia.

He also had guest roles in series such as Skippy the Bush Kangaroo, Secret Valley, Five Mile Creek, Cop Shop, Prisoner, Special Squad, A Country Practice, Rafferty's Rules and Mission: Impossible.

Sweet's film credits include period crime drama Squizzy Taylor (1982), western film Quigley Down Under (1990) alongside Tom Selleck and the television movies The Highest Honour (1982), Queen of the Road (1984) and Robbery (1985) inspired by the real life Great Bookie Robbery committed in Melbourne, on 21 April 1976. His most recent film credit was action film Fink! (2005) in which he appeared alongside Sam Worthington.

== Filmography ==
=== Film ===
Year	Title	Role	Notes
1982	Squizzy Taylor	Snowy's mate	
1990	Quigley Down Under	Sergeant Thomas	
2005	Fink! (aka Pros and Ex-Cons)	Mr Peabody	

=== Television ===
Year	Title	Role	Notes	Ref.
1968	The Battlers	Bambi	1 episode	
1968	Bellbird	Stephen Quinney		
1969	Skippy the Bush Kangaroo	Brian	1 episode	
1969	Riptide	Neal Winton	8 episodes	
1972	Pathfinders	Flying Officer Bill Short / F	2 episodes	
1973	Moonbase 3	Walters	2 episodes	
1976	Play for Today	Reporter	1 episode	
	The Restless Years			
1980	Secret Valley		1 episode	
1981; 1984	Cop Shop	Andrew Jones	2 episodes	
1981	Sporting Chance			
1982	Jonah	Jonah	Miniseries, 4 episodes	
1982	The Highest Honour	Cpl A Crilley	TV movie	
1984	Five Mile Creek	Collinson	1 episode	
1984	Prisoner	Keith Scott	3 episodes	
1984	Queen of the Road	Max	TV movie	
1984	Special Squad	Del	Episode 24: "Earlybird"	
1984	Carson's Law	Kenneth Oakley	5 episodes	
1985	Anzacs	Bill Harris	Miniseries, 5 episodes	
1986	Robbery	Banks	TV movie	
1988	The Alien Years	McVeigh	Miniseries	
1988	A Country Practice	Travis Cooper	2 episodes	
1989	Rafferty's Rules	Detective Perkins	1 episode	
1989	Mission: Impossible	Crosby	1 episode	
1991	Heroes II: The Return	Mackenzie	Miniseries, 2 episodes	
1998	Vengeance Unlimited		1 episode	

== Theatre ==
=== As actor ===
Year	Title	Role	Notes
1966	Two Programs of Short Plays: Endgame / The Ballad of the Sad Café	Nagg / Cousin Lymon	Jane Street Theatre, Sydney with NIDA
1967	Camille and Perdican	Father Bridaine	UNSW Old Tote Theatre, Sydney with NIDA
1967	Point of Departure	The Manager / Hotel Waiter	UNSW Old Tote Theatre, Sydney with NIDA
1967	Three Men on a Horse	Frankie	UNSW Old Tote Theatre, Sydney with NIDA
1967	The Schoolmistress		UNSW Old Tote Theatre, Sydney
1967	The Winter's Tale	Cleomenes	UNSW Old Tote Theatre, Sydney with NIDA
1982	Conundra		Phillip St Theatre, Sydney
1982; 1983	A Night in the Arms of Raeleen		Stables Theatre, Sydney with Griffin Theatre Company
1985	The Heretic	Giovanni Mocenigo	Sydney Opera House with Melaleuka Productions
1986	Having a Ball..!		Canberra Theatre with AETT
1990	Observe the Sons of Ulster Marching Towards the Somme	George Anderson	Crossroads Theatre, Sydney with O'Punksky's Theatre Co
1990	Little Malcolm and His Struggle Against the Eunuchs	John 'Wick' Blagden	Crossroads Theatre, Sydney with O'Punksky's Theatre Co
1991	Kurtz		Crossroads Theatre, Sydney
1991; 1992	Dial M for Murder		Marian St Theatre, Sydney, Playhouse Adelaide

=== As crew ===
Year	Title	Role	Notes	Ref.
	The Slab Boys	Set / Programme cover design	Crossroads Theatre, Sydney with O'Punksky's Theatre Co	
