= Jimmy Marks (RAF officer) =

James Hardy Marks
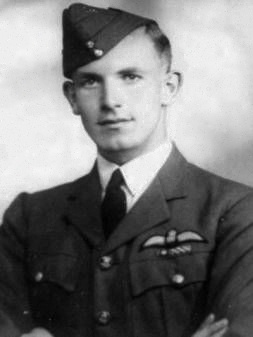
- Jimmy Marks in 1942
- Born: 19 March 1918; Tolleshunt D'Arcy, England
- Died: 20 September 1942 (aged 24); Blesme, France
- Military career
- Allegiance: United Kingdom
- Branch: Royal Air Force
- Service years: 1937–1942
- Rank: Wing Commander
- Nickname: Jimmy
- Commands: No. 35 Squadron RAF
- Conflicts: Second World War
- Awards: Distinguished Service Order & Bar; Distinguished Flying Cross; Mentioned in Despatches (2)

James Hardy Marks, DSO & Bar, DFC (19 March 1918 – 20 September 1942) was an officer in the Royal Air Force. An early proponent of developing a target marking method, he was the commanding officer of 35 Squadron when it was selected as one of the five founding squadrons of the Pathfinder Force. He was considered by his contemporaries as one of the top aviators of his time. He was killed while returning from a raid against Saarbrücken when his Halifax was set afire from an attack from a German night fighter. Marks stayed at the controls to allow his crew to escape before his aircraft crashed near Blesme in northern France.

== Early life ==
Marks was born in Tolleshunt D'Arcy on 19 March 1918. At the age of 2 his family moved to Sawbridgeworth in Hertfordshire, where he grew up. Marks attended Barnard School and proceeded to Newport Free Grammar School, where he was a standout in cricket and football. He graduated in 1936. By his late teens he had become a tall young man, with fair hair and an athletic build, who exuded a quiet authoritative presence.

Following his graduation he obtained a pilot's license. In 1937 he joined the Royal Air Force. He made his first solo flight in April 1937, and completed pilot training at No. 10 Flying Training Unit at RAF Ternhill. On 24 May 1938 his crew was selected for an Empire Day display at Martlesham Heath. In January 1939 he was part of a flight that gave an air display to the top ranks of the service and a delegation from North Africa.

== Early bomber missions ==
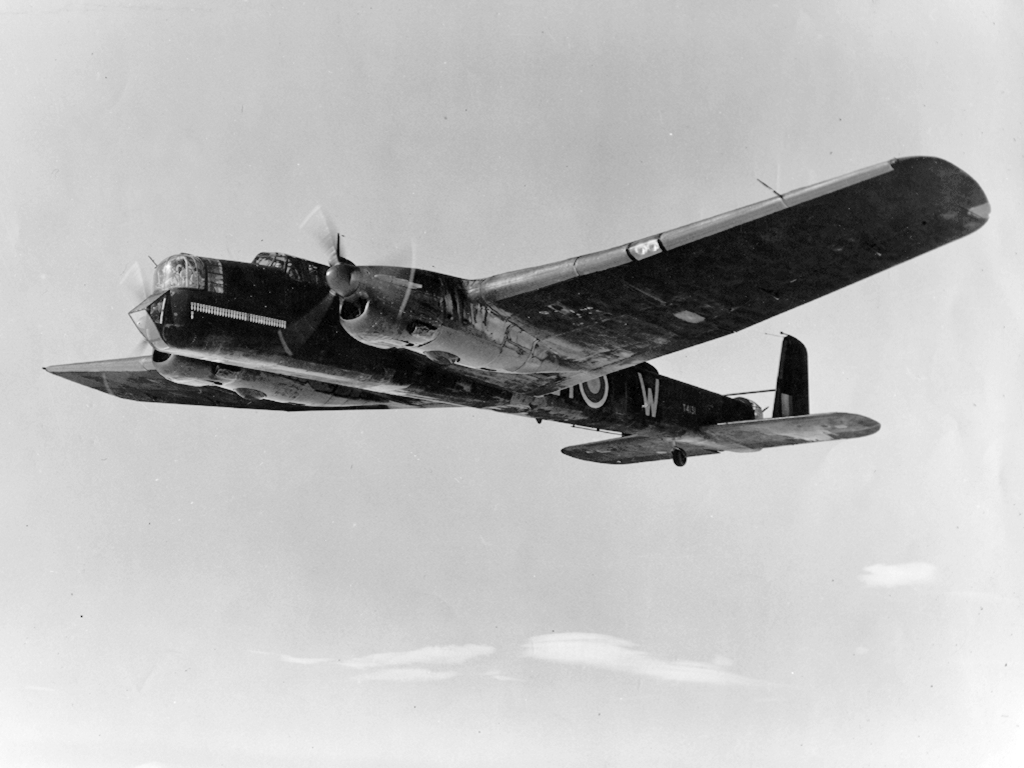
The Whitley twin-engine bomber

At the outset of the Second World War in September 1939, Marks was a bomber pilot with No. 102 Squadron, flying the two engine Whitley bomber. Marks flew with Leonard Cheshire at 102 Squadron. At the outset the squadron was tasked with the dropping of leaflets over Germany and the occupied countries, with many of its early missions going to Poland. On 1 November 1939 Marks and his squadron flew to RAF Dishforth, where it stood for inspection by Air Chief Marshal Sir Hugh Dowding, commander-in-chief of Fighter Command, Air Chief Marshal Sir Cyril Newall, the Chief of the Air Staff, and King George VI. The pamphlet campaign continued through the end of the year, during a period known as the phony war.

In 1939 102 Squadron was based at Driffield, along with 77 Squadron. The two squadrons were a part of 4 Group Bomber Command. In January 1940 the leaflet policy was changed, and Bomber Command was freed to begin bombing raids against targets in Germany in earnest. No. 77 Squadron undertook its first bombing mission against a German target on 19 March, when it was flown against the German sea plane base at the southern tip of the island of Sylt. In the coming months Marks was engaged on raids on variety of disparate targets, including Posen, Prague, Warsaw, Hanover, Trondheim and Oslo, and was mentioned in despatches "for gallant and distinguished services."

In May 1940 German forces invaded the Netherlands, Belgium and France. British bomber forces did what they could to stem the German advance, but were largely ineffective. On 20 May whilst attacking bridges in France Marks' aircraft was hit by flak and the plane's hydraulic system was knocked out. He lost the use of his flaps, but he was still able to land his aircraft, though his ground speed at landing was much higher than normal. The following night 21 May he participated in a raid against Cologne and returned on one engine. For the rest of the month he was involved in attacking German transport support, striking Quesney Cross-roads in France on 23 May, Walcheren on 25 May and the Neuss railway junction on 27 May.

On 1 June 1940, Marks was awarded the Distinguished Flying Cross (DFC). According to his citation, he "has shown tenacity of purpose, a high courage and thoroughness of planning and execution which is beyond praise."

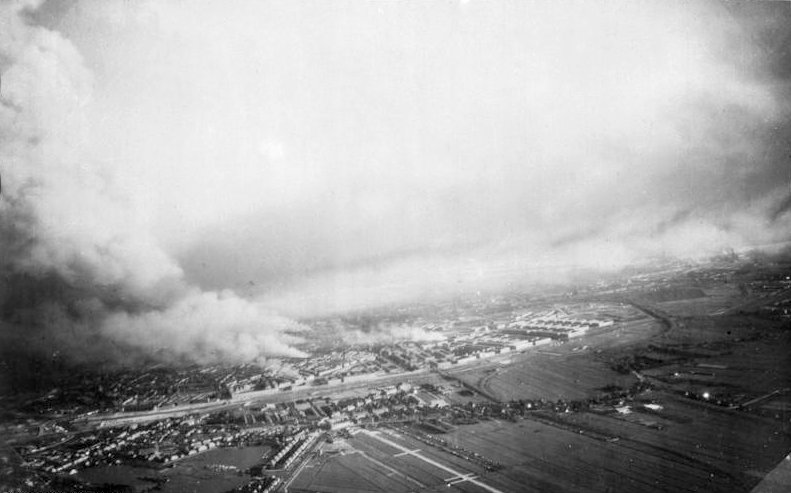
Rotterdam's city centre afire as seen during the day

In the early days of the war it proved difficult to attack targets from the air with a conventional bomber due to a tremendous lack of accuracy. During the daytime such targets as railway junctions and cross roads could be located and attacked, but individual vehicles and other small targets could not be because bomber aircraft simply lacked the ability to deliver bombs with that kind of precision. It was much more difficult at night. Even attacking larger targets such as road junctions and troop concentrations was not effective. Flying in the dark of night each aircraft was in its own world. They were unaware of the position of other bombers around them, were unable to see them, and with the target itself shrouded in darkness it was very difficult for the squadron to deliver its bombs in a concentration upon the target.

Following the German air raid against Rotterdam the center of the city was set afire, which could be seen at night from a very great distance. Marks believed this created an opportunity for the base's bombers from 102 Squadron and 77 Squadron to strike at German troop concentrations under the cover of night. He wanted the navigators to use the center of the fire as a start point of a timed run against German forces to the northeast of the city. Leading a group of 12 Whitleys, Marks instructed the aircrews to fire off Very lights over the target area so the bombers could find each other and group back together. They were also to drop marker flares over the target itself. The planes would then bomb the troop concentration. This was the first time the RAF attempted to locate a target at night by making a timed run from a known point.

The attack was carried out as planned, but when the Very flares were fired off not one of the aircraft saw any of the others, and their bombs were scattered ineffectively. Undeterred, Marks asked his squadron commander to allow him to repeat the attack the following night. Permission was granted, but for the retry Marks chose to use only the 4 best crews with the 4 best navigators. The airspeed indicators on the Whitleys were re-calibrated, and the aircraft compasses were re-swung. This time when they reached the target area and fired their Very flares all four bombers were within 3 miles of each other. One of the target markers was dropped over the target, and a first successful night bombing attack was made. The episode made a strong impression on 77 Squadron bomber pilot Hamish Mahaddie, one of the three other pilots who was in on both attempts. Mahaddie would go on to fly with the Pathfinder Force, and stated he always thought if Harris ever formed a target marking force, Marks would be a part of it.

On 10 June Italy declared war on England and France. That night 20 Whitleys based at Driffield from 102 and 77 Squadrons set out to bomb the Fiat Works in Turin. Only 4 of the 20 managed to get over the Alps and reach the target. Marks was flying one of them. On his return flight over the Alps his two engines took turns failing, but he was able to restart them each time. His log book comment referred to the return flight obliquely, stating simply "rather hectic." He completed 11 raids in June. After this period he was scored "exceptional as a heavy bomber pilot and navigator."

== Second tour ==
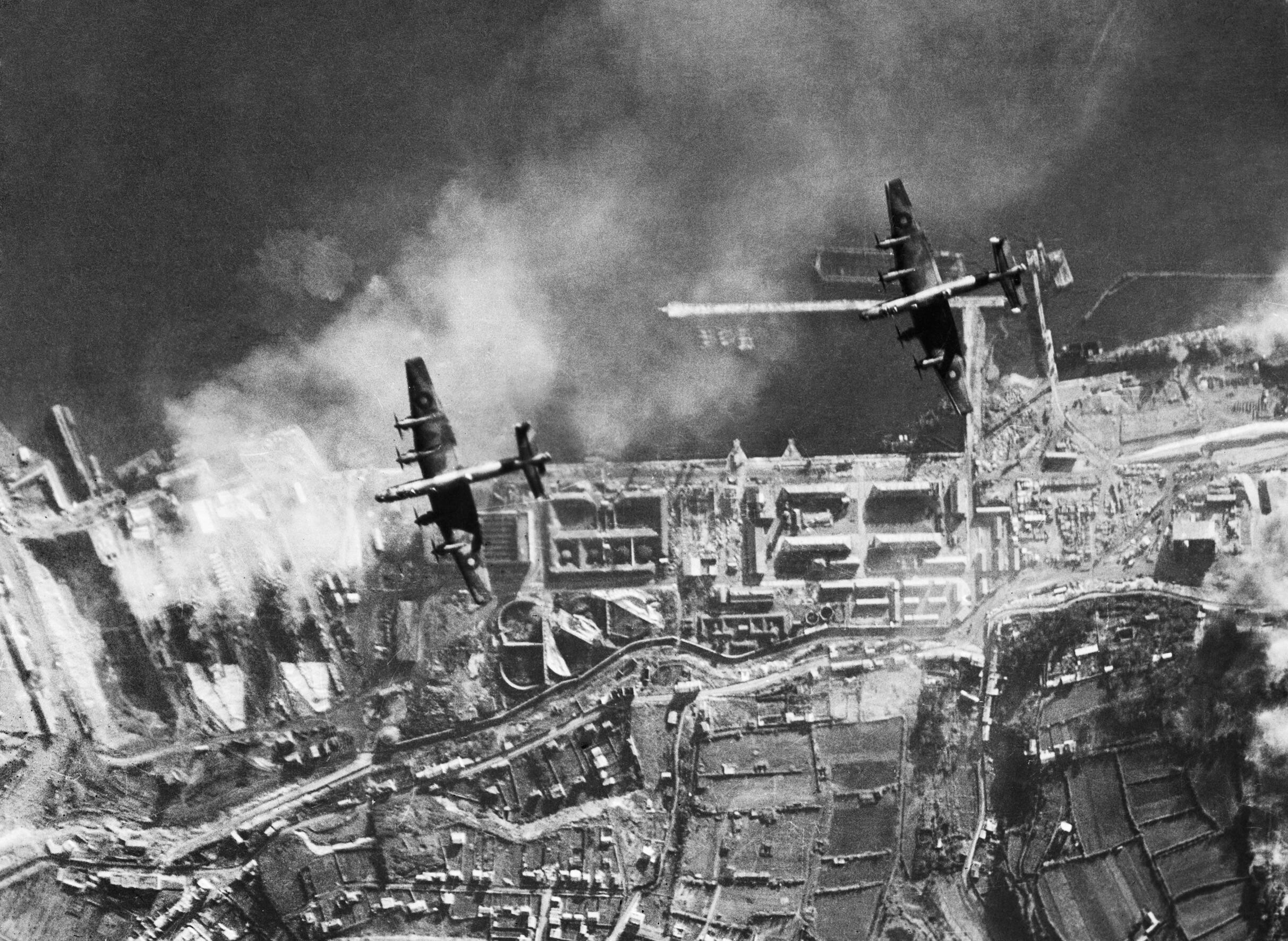
35 Squadron Halifaxes attack German battlecrusiers Scharnhorst and Gneisenau in drydock at Brest, December 1941

Marks returned to operations in March 1941 and served with No. 58 Squadron, where he was engaged in attacks against Brest. There the German warships Scharnhorst and Gneisenau were in dock, joined in June by the Prinz Eugen. In April 1941 he flew a raid against Emden, where his aircraft was attacked over the target by a Bf 110. One engine was put out of action and his Whitley's tail rudder was partly carried away. Marks had to ditch his bombs, and struggled to get his aircraft home. Over RAF Bircham Newton a crewman discovered that one of the plane's 500 lb bombs had become jammed in the bomb bay. A rough landing risked setting it off. Fortunately he was able to free it up and release it by hand. Bomber Command's Commander in Chief, Richard Peirse, issued a personal commendation to all ranks in the aircraft for "the courage, pertinacity and airmanship displayed by the crew." Marks received a second mention in Despatches. In April 1941, he was promoted to squadron leader. In May the squadron was stood down while their Halifax aircraft underwent modifications. Marks was sent to Canada to ferry back an aircraft. In June he was engaged in raids on Berlin, Hamburg, Bremen and Düsseldorf. In July 1941 he was awarded the Distinguished Service Order (DSO).

German battleship Tirpitz hidden in the Fættenfjord

On 1 September 1941 Marks was promoted to the acting rank of squadron leader. He was transferred to No. 35 Squadron and was trained on one of the new four engine bombers, the Handley Page Halifax. Marks again received the rating for flying and navigation of "exceptional". In March 1942, Marks was made wing commander and given command of No. 35 Squadron. On 30 March he led the squadron in a low level attack against the German battleship Tirpitz in the Norwegian Fættenfjord. The ship was heavily defended by flak emplacements, but Marks pressed on in his attack. He led a second attack against the ship on the night of 27/28 April. For these actions he was awarded a Bar to his DSO. Over the spring Marks led the squadron in raids against Essen and Hamburg. He had completed more than fifty operational sorties by the age of 23.

== With the Pathfinder Force ==
In June 1942 ideas for helping bombers find their target more easily came to fruition with the creation of the Pathfinder Force. Each Group contributed a squadron to the new force. Marks and his 35 Squadron were selected from 4 Group. Marks had led his squadron on a remarkable 100 sorties without a crew loss. His was one of the five squadrons selected to form the Pathfinder Force. The squadron, with hand-picked crews from the group, along with their ground support staff arrived in RAF Graveley the first day the force was formed. Marks led his squadron on the first Pathfinder raid against Flensberg.

Though a four engine heavy bomber with a 5,800 lb payload, the Halifax had a number of problems. Marks noted that the front gun turret partially obstructed the view of the pilot. He had it removed from his aircraft and replaced with a section of clear Perspex. The modification was reviewed by Handley-Page at the production center in Radlett and accepted. This change was incorporated into the production of Halifaxes in October 1942.

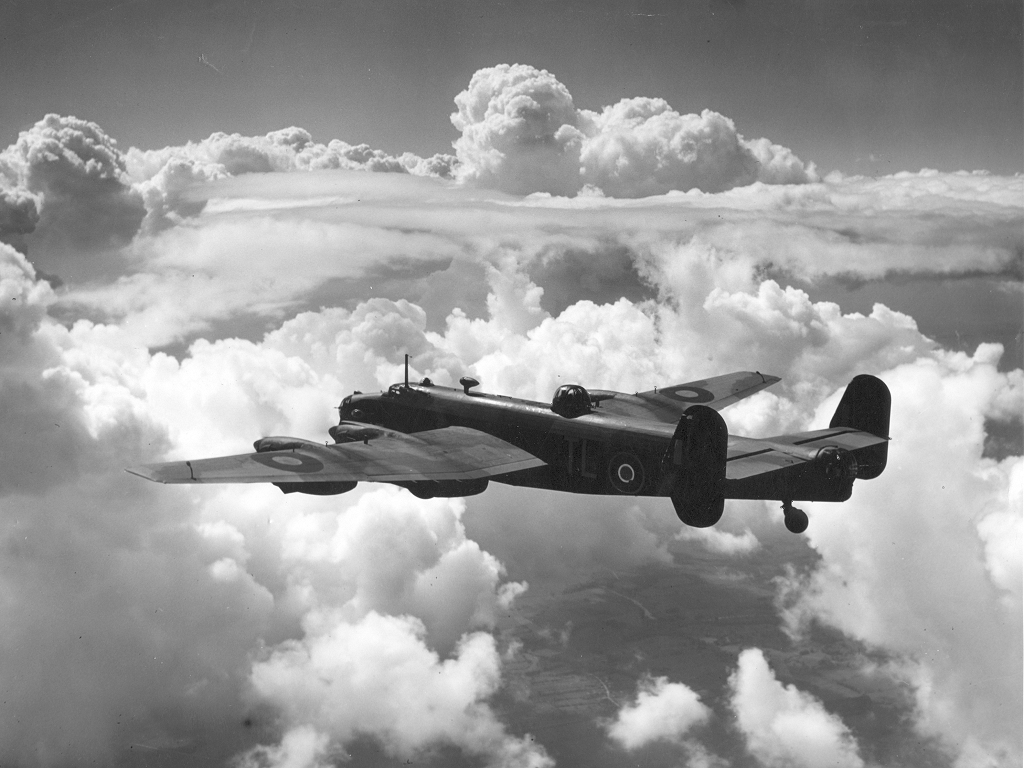
The Halifax bomber

Pilot visibility, however, was not the major problem with the Halifax. Leonard Cheshire, a friend of Marks who flew with him in Nos. 77 and 35 Squadrons, was experiencing problems with the aircraft as well. "The Halifax was temperamental. You learned to treat her with caution, but she wasn't really, we learned later, a safe aircraft. There was no margin of error when you got near to the stall. We suddenly became aware that nobody came back on three engines. I took the aircraft up and deliberately stalled her, and I found that you could not get out of the stall. The only way to get out of stall was to apply both opposite engines and both feet on one side of the rudder and use all your strength, and only then you just got out. So a man who had lost an engine while on ops had no chance."

The Halifax was a significant concern for Bomber Command commander in chief Arthur Harris. In a letter to the Air Ministry in 1942, he wrote "The Stirling and the Halifax are now our major worries. They presage disaster unless solutions are found. Regarding the Halifax, nothing ponderable is being done to make this deplorable product worthy for war or fit to meet those jeopardizes, which confront our gallant crews."

On the night of 19 September 1942, just before he was to be made group captain, Marks stepped in at the last moment to take over an aircraft whose pilot was unable to fly on a raid against Saarbrücken. On the return flight, his plane was attacked from below by a Bf 110. The Halifax was struck at the mainplane, and fuel cells 5 and 6 were set ablaze. The fire soon engulfed the fuselage. Marks stayed at the controls while he instructed his crew to bail out. Said one of his crew members: "I was the last to leave the plane, and when I passed the captain on my way to bailout he was having to fight terrifically to keep the aircraft in any sort of trim. I felt as soon as he left the controls the aircraft would have gone so haywire so as to make bailing out for him impossible." He kept the plane in the air long enough for three of his crew to parachute out. They were interned and survived the war. Marks was the first commanding officer of the four founding Pathfinder bombing squadrons to lose his life. At the time of his death he was just 24 years old.

The Halifax problem lay in its undersized tail-plane rudder. Their small control surfaces led to rudder overbalance when power was lost. When the problem was finally identified, Handley Page initially did not want to disrupt aircraft production to make the change. Upon Cheshire's insistence the design was changed to a larger, trapezoidal-shaped vertical tail surfaces which solved the control deficiencies. The entire force of Halifaxes had to be stood down for a month while the planes were being modified.

On 19 September 1992, the 50th anniversary of the mission that cost him his life, a memorial to Marks and his crew was unveiled at Blesme in France, near the site where his plane went down. The unveiling ceremony was attended by the city mayor and the sole living survivor of his last flight, Flight Engineer William G. Higgs. For his fallen captain, Higgs offered "Jimmy Marks was a brilliant pilot, a wonderful leader, and a man this country could ill afford to lose." Cheshire wrote an article after the war about his early days with 102 Squadron, and recalled the pilots he had known while flying out of RAF Topcliffe. Reviewing in his mind's eye the young men sitting about the crew room with him waiting for their mission, many now gone, he recalled looking across the room and thinking:

There sat Jimmy Marks, the greatest pilot in the room, if not in the whole of Bomber Command. His greatness lay in the phenomenal strength of his will-power and in his complete calm.

— Leonard Cheshire

== Awards ==
- Distinguished Flying Cross 9 July 1940 (Note: Citation reads: The Commander-in-Chief desires to bring to the notice of all ranks in the Command the courage, pertinacity and airmanship displayed by the crew of a Whitley aircraft which was detailed to bomb docks and shipping at Emden on the night of 7/9 April 1941. The Captain of the aircraft, No. 39670, Squadron Leader J.H. Marks, D.F.O., was just about to bomb when he was attacked from the rear by a night fighter. The first burst hit the starboard engine, which stopped, thereby immobilizing the rear turret. A second attack from below would have had far more serious consequences but for the protection afforded by the 500 lb. bombs. On its final attack from head on, the night fighter approached so close that it is presumed it must have struck the rudder of the Whitley with its wing. Half of the rudder was severed completely, and when last seen the fighter was banking over steeply in a dive as though one wing was damaged. At this time, in spite of jettisoning bombs, the aircraft had lost height to 700 feet, and the Captain decided to make for Norfolk., and at this height, limped across some 50 miles of hostile and occupied territory. The Air observer, No. 745646 Sergeant Southon, F.A., pulled up the floor boards and discovered one 500 lb. bomb which had not dropped. This he released by hand, after which the aircraft climbed gradually to 1,000 ft. and a successful landing was made at Bircham Newton. It is considered that the courage and behaviour of the whole crew during this flight was excellent.)
- Distinguished Service Order 23 September 1941 (Note: Citation reads: This Officer has completed a further 27 operational sorties since being awarded the Distinguished Flying Cross. He has continued to show great courage, resourcefulness and unfailing devotion to duty. As a Flight Commander, his powers of leadership, enthusiasm and ability to carry out his job under any conditions, have been an inspiration to all whom he has come in contact.)
- Bar to Distinguished Service Order 4 August 1942 (Note: Citation reads: This Officer led his Squadron on a bombing raid on the German battleship TIRPITZ on the 27/28 April 1942 in addition to having taken part in a similar attack the previous month. The enemy had concentrated heavy defences over the target area and this was well known to this officer, but despite this fact he came down to about 200 feet and flew through the fiercest of defences to press home his attack, releasing his bombs on the ship or at any rate close to the ship. In addition to his own magnificent example of courage, his superb leadership, sense of duty, enthusiasm, cheerfulness and determination which he exhibited at all times were largely responsible for the gallant way in which the other crews of his Squadron went in to the attack. For this I very strongly recommend that he be awarded immediately the First Bar to his Distinguished Flying Cross. This officer received his D.F.C. after completing 37 sorties and 249 operational hours, and his D.S.O. after 43 sorties and 291 operational hours. [Instead of a second DFC, Marks was awarded a second DSO. The second DSO was awarded as a bar for the ribbon of the first DSO.])
- In addition, Marks was twice mentioned in Despatches for notable war services, first on 20 February 1940 and again on 11 June 1942.
