= Rhys McConnochie =

Australian actor (1936–2026)

- Born: Maynard Rhys McConnochie; 28 December 1936; Auckland, New Zealand
- Died: 10 November 2026 (aged 89); Red Beach, New Zealand
- Occupations: Actor, theatre director, singer, educator
- Years active: 1957–2017

Maynard Rhys McConnochie (28 December 1936 – 10 November 2026) was a New Zealand-born Australian actor who worked across theatre, film and television, and was also a theatre director and educator.

McConnochie worked in his native New Zealand, before working across Europe and England with the Royal Shakespeare Company, he was then based in Australia.

== Life and career ==
=== Early life ===
McConnochie was born in Auckland, New Zealand, on 28 December 1936. He was educated at Auckland Grammar School.

=== Career ===
McConnochie began his acting career in New Zealand, producing and starring in a stage production of Murder in the Cathedral in Gisborne.

However, by the early 1960s, he decided to try his luck in England. A government bursary took him to Paris where he spent two years at the Antonetti Mime School. Afterwards, he spent two years with the Royal Shakespeare Company at Stratford and Aldwych. Further repertory included Lincoln, Birmingham, Exeter and the Everyman Theatre, Liverpool, as well as appearances in television series. During this time, McConnochie became Associate Director at the Gateway Theatre, Chester and Theatre Royal Stratford East.

Returning to New Zealand in 1981, McConnochie was invited to perform in Sydney and has since worked in Australia.

His screen appearances include the TV miniseries Bodyline as Pelham Warner and Darlings of the Gods as Ralph Richardson and the 1985 film Robbery.

For his performance in Come in Spinner, McConnochie was nominated for the 1990 Australian Film Institute Award for Best Performance by an Actor in a Leading Role, in a Mini-Series or Telefeature.

He also had a long theatre career working on the likes of Sixteen Words for Water for the Sydney Theatre Company, Inheritance with the Melbourne and Sydney Theatre Companies and the original production of Bingo at the Northcott Theatre.

McConnochie trained drama students at Sydney's NIDA, Perth's WAAPA and the Victorian College of the Arts.

=== Death ===
The Melbourne Theatre Company announced that McConnochie died on 10 November 2026, at the age of 89. He died in Red Beach, New Zealand with his obituary featured in the New Zealand Herald.

== Filmography ==
=== Film ===
Year	Title	Role	Type
1983	The Amorous Dentist		TV movie
1984	The Wild Duck	Dr Roland	Feature film
1985	The Empty Beach	Garth Green	Feature film
1985	Robbery	Michael Webster	TV movie
1986	Charley's Web	Prime Minister Lowe	TV movie
1986	Short Changed	School Principal	Feature film
1987	Bullseye	Justice Collins	Film
1988	The Man from Snowy River II	Alistair Patton Sr.	Feature film

=== Television ===
Year	Title	Role	Type
1965	The Wars of the Roses	Vernon	TV play
1967	Doctor Who	Rod	1 episode; serial: The Enemy of the World
1980	The Imitation Game	Technical Officer	TV play
1984	Bodyline	Pelham Warner	TV miniseries
1984	Special Squad	Mathieson	TV series (episode 21: "A Wild Oat")
1985	Anzacs	Lloyd George	TV miniseries
1988	Australians		TV series (episode 13: "Errol Flynn")
1989	Brotherhood of the Rose	Orlik	TV miniseries
1989	Darlings of the Gods	Ralph Richardson	TV miniseries
1990	Come In Spinner	Angus McFarland	TV miniseries, 4 episodes
2002–03	MDA	Giles Jones, QC	TV series
2013	Paper Giants: Magazine Wars	Lionel King	TV miniseries

== Theatre ==
=== As actor ===
Year	Title	Role	Venue / Company
1973	Bingo	Ben Jonson	Northcott Theatre
2003	Inheritance	William	Playhouse, Arts Centre Melbourne with Melbourne Theatre Company & Sydney Opera House with Sydney Theatre Company

=== As crew ===
Year	Title	Role	Venue / Company
2003	Sixteen Words for Water	Director	The Wharf Theatre / Sydney Theatre Company
1969	The Lincoln Cycle of Mystery Plays	Assistant	York Cathedral with Lincoln Theatre Royal

== Awards & nominations ==
Year	Nominated work	Award	Category	Result
1990	Come In Spinner	Australian Film Institute Awards	Best Performance by an Actor in a Leading Role, in a Mini-Series or Telefeature	Nominated
