= Jonah (novel) =

Novel by Louis Stone

- Author: Louis Stone
- Language: English
- Genre: Fiction
- Publisher: Methuen, London
- Publication date: 1911
- Publication place: Australia
- Media type: Print
- Pages: 293pp
- Preceded by: –
- Followed by: Betty Wayside

Jonah (1911) is a novel by Australian writer Louis Stone.

== Story outline ==
Jonah, a hunchback larrikin, lives in a Sydney slum where he is the leader of the local "Push", a street gang. But his life changes when he becomes father to a son, and he strives to break away from his previous life.

== Critical reception ==
A reviewer in The Sydney Morning Herald understood the worth of the novel from its first publication: "In Jonah, Mr. Louis Stone has given us an excellent novel. He has taken a phase of Australian life which has been rather neglected by local writers, and laid his setting in the slums of Sydney of a few years ago. Mr. Stone knows his subject, and writes with humour and observation, and a great deal of kindliness. His theme is often squalid, and the surroundings often repellent, but the author, without idealising, does not lay undue insistence on the unpleasant."

Writing about the book in The Queensland Times as it was about to be reprinted in 1933, Aidan de Brune stated: "Competent critics declare that this book is a worthy successor to Robbery Under Arms and For the Term of His Natural Life, amongst Australian novels that can properly be called "classic.""

== Adaptations ==
Jonah was adapted for a television series by the Australian Broadcasting Commission in 1982. It also provided the basis for the musical Jonah Jones by John Romeril and Alan John, first produced by the Sydney Theatre Company in 1985.

== See also ==
- Full text of the novel from University of Sydney
- 1911 in Australian literature

== Notes ==
In his book, The Making of the Sentimental Bloke, Alec H. Chisholm notes that Louis Stone was certain that C.J. Dennis had stolen his larrikin ideas for his popular verse novel The Songs of a Sentimental Bloke, though he, Chisholm, was not so sure.
