= Jimmy Marks =

Jimmy Marks may refer to:

- Hybrid (Jimmy Marks), Marvel supervillain
- Jimmy Marks (born 1945), Romani American
- Jimmy Marks (RAF officer) (born 1918), Royal Air Force officer
