= Pathfinders (TV series) =

- Created by: Gerry Brown
- Starring: Robert Urquhart; Jack Watling; Julian Orchard
- Country of origin: United Kingdom
- No. of episodes: 13

Production
- Running time: 60 minutes

Original release
- Network: ITV
- Release: 27 September 1972 – 25 January 1973

Pathfinders (1972–1973, aka The Pathfinders) is an ITV drama set in the Second World War, telling the story of the fictitious Royal Air Force 192 Pathfinder squadron. The Pathfinders were specialised RAF squadrons that marked targets for RAF Bomber Command.

The series used radio controlled Avro Lancaster models for the flying scenes. The technical adviser for the series was Group Captain Hamish Mahaddie. The music was by Malcolm Lockyer.

== Premise ==
A new squadron is formed with hand-picked, volunteer crews to rectify the highly inaccurate bombing of the Royal Air Force: 95% of all bombs are more than 10 miles (16 km) away from the target, according to Wing Commander MacPhearson. They are supposed to receive three weeks training and evaluation, but are instead given their first mission for that night by naysayers eager to discredit the concept.

== Cast ==
- Robert Urquhart as Wing Commander MacPhearson (13 episodes)
- Jack Watling as Doc Saxon (12 episodes)
- Julian Orchard as The Padre (4 episodes)
- Jack May as Squadron Leader Shanks (3 episodes)
- Christopher Cazenove as Flight Lieutenant Doug Phillips (2 episodes)
- Jonathan Sweet as Flying Officer Bill Short / F (2 episodes)
- Mark McManus as Flight Sergeant Joe Cameron (1 episode)

== Episodes ==
No.	Title	Original release date	Guest cast
1	"Into the Fire"	27 September 1972	Jeremy Bulloch, Jack May, Luan Peters, David Ashford
2	"For Better, For Worse"	4 October 1972	Peter Armitage, Peter Blythe, Jennifer Clulow, Tony Selby, David Simeon, David Warwick
3	"Fog"	11 October 1972	Christopher Cazenove, Michael Craze, Richard Heffer, William Marlowe, Jack May, Kate O'Mara
4	"Fly There, Walk Back"	18 October 1972	Michael Coles, Arnold Diamond, Wolfe Morris, Jane Seymour, David Weston, Michael Wolf
5	"Jonah Man" "Forced to Ditch" (NTSC VHS)	1 November 1972	Eric Flynn, Ray Lonnen, Mark McManus, Julian Orchard, Sheila Ruskin
6	"One Man's Lancaster"	8 November 1972	Jeremy Bulloch, John D. Collins, Anthony Valentine
7	"Sitting Ducks"	15 November 1972	John Arnatt, John Barron, Edd Byrnes, Brian Grellis, Rutger Hauer, Roy Holder, John Horsley, David Lodge, Basil Moss, Julian Orchard, Johnnie Wade, Kenneth Watson, Hans De Vries, Richard Shaw
8	"Our Daffodils Are Better Than Your Daffodils" "Assignment Top Secret" (NTSC VHS)	6 December 1972	Peter Egan, John Levene, David Lodge, Christopher Timothy, Neville Barber
9	"Codename Gomorrah"	13 December 1972	Donald Douglas, Bernard Lee, Paul Massie, Mike Pratt
10	"Sweets From a Stranger" "Unusual Ally" (NTSC VHS)	3 January 1973	Geoffrey Bayldon, Johnny Briggs, Christopher Cazenove, Linda Marlowe, Jack May, Morris Perry, Shirley Stelfox
11	"Operation Pickpocket"	10 January 1973	Ian Collier, Mark Eden, Richard Franklin, Olaf Pooley, Michael Wolf
12	"Nightmare"	17 January 1973	John Bluthal, Julian Orchard, Paul Shelley, Ian Stirling
13	"In the Face of the Enemy"	25 January 1973	Ray Brooks, Susan Jameson, Diane Keen, Julian Orchard, Dennis Waterman

In 2006, Simply Media released the series on DVD in the UK. Despite being sold as "The Complete Series", the release is actually missing Episode 8 "Our Daffodils Are Better Than Your Daffodils", without any explanation. The episode was also missing from the 2002 four-tape UK VHS release of Pathfinders from DD Video, although the episode was released in the US on VHS using the title "Assignment Top Secret".
