= Charley's Web =

- Written by: Simon Heath
- Directed by: Simon Heath
- Starring: Max Cullen; Justine Saunders; Rhys McConnochie; Ken Wayne
- Country of origin: Australia
- Original language: English

Production
- Producer: Nene Morgan

Original release
- Release: 1986

Charley's Web is an Australian film shot in 1984 about a man who dreams of being Prime Minister.

== Cast ==
- Max Cullen as Charley O'Keefe
- Justine Saunders as Jane Lynch
- Rhys McConnochie as Prime Minister Lowe
- Ken Wayne as Richard Wilson
