= Red Beach =

Red Beach may refer to:

- Red Beach, New Zealand, a suburb on the Hibiscus Coast, Auckland, New Zealand
- Red Beach (Panjin), Dawa County, Panjin, Liaoning, China
- Red Beach (Santorini), Greece
- Red Beach Base Area, a complex of former U.S. military bases in Vietnam
- Red Beach (Hormuz Island), a beach on Hormuz Island in Iran
