= Hamish Mahaddie =

World War II RAF pilot

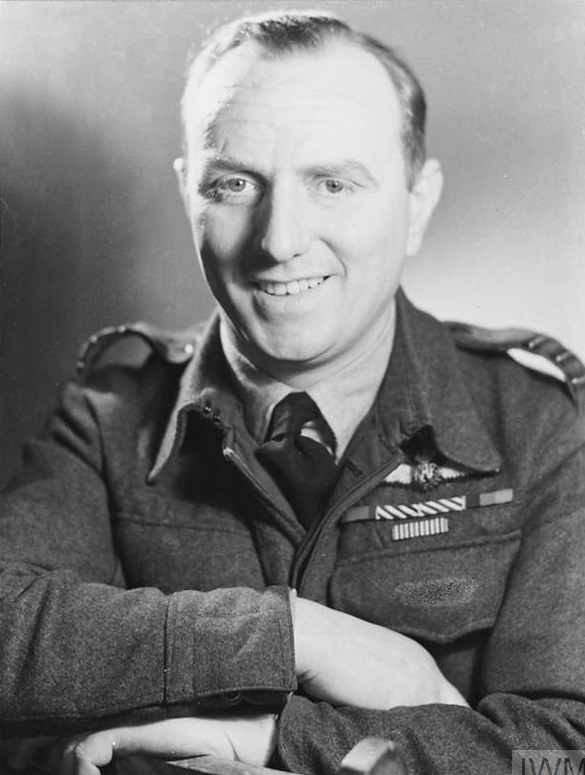
- T. G. "Hamish" Mahaddie
- Born: 19 March 1911; Leith, Scotland
- Died: 16 January 1997 (aged 85)
- Military career
- Allegiance: United Kingdom
- Branch: Royal Air Force
- Service years: 1928–1959
- Rank: Group captain
- Nickname: Hamish
- Commands: RAF Butzweilerhof; RAF Sylt; No. 111 Wing RAF; RAF Warboys
- Conflicts: Second World War
- Awards: Distinguished Service Order; Distinguished Flying Cross; Air Force Cross & Bar; Mentioned in Despatches (3); War Cross (Czechoslovakia)

Group Captain Thomas Gilbert "Hamish" Mahaddie, DSO, DFC, AFC & Bar, FRAeS (19 March 1911 – 16 January 1997) was a Scotsman who served in the Royal Air Force (RAF). As a youth he was selected for an apprentice programme and was trained as an RAF ground crew "metal rigger". He had earned his wings and reached the rank of sergeant pilot by the outbreak of the Second World War. In his second tour he was selected to be a member of the newly formed "Pathfinder Force" (No. 8 Group RAF). At the end of his second combat tour he was brought onto Air Vice Marshal Don Bennett's Headquarter Staff in the position of "Group Training Inspector". In this position he selected, recruited and trained aircrews to serve in the Pathfinder Force. Following the war he continued to serve in the RAF until 1958. Out of the service he worked as an electronics consultant for the Armed Services, and as an aircraft consultant for the film industry. His most remarkable accomplishment in the film industry was the procurement of aircraft, crews and service personnel for the film Battle of Britain (1969).

== Early life ==
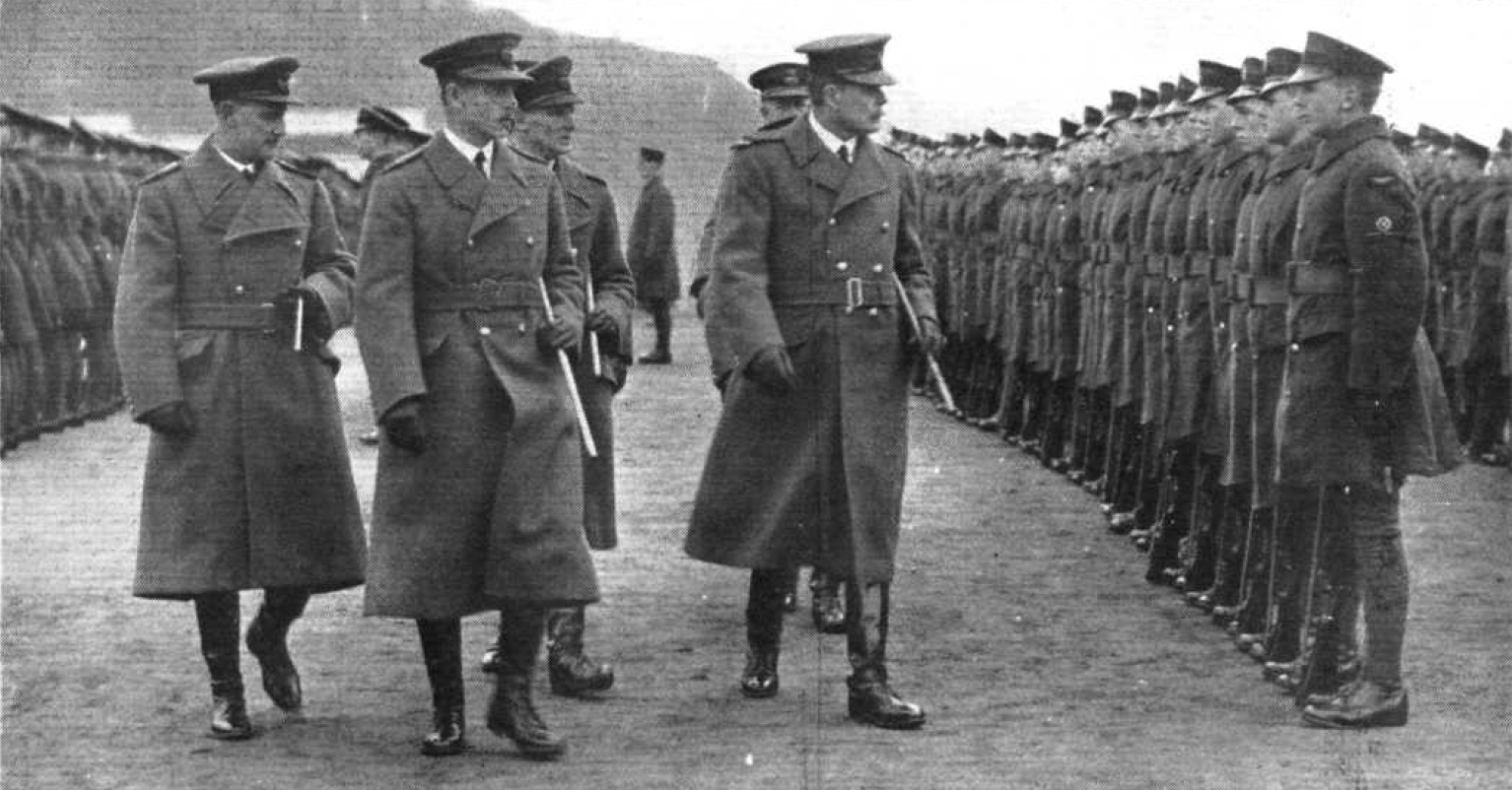
Review at the RAF Halton training school, 1927

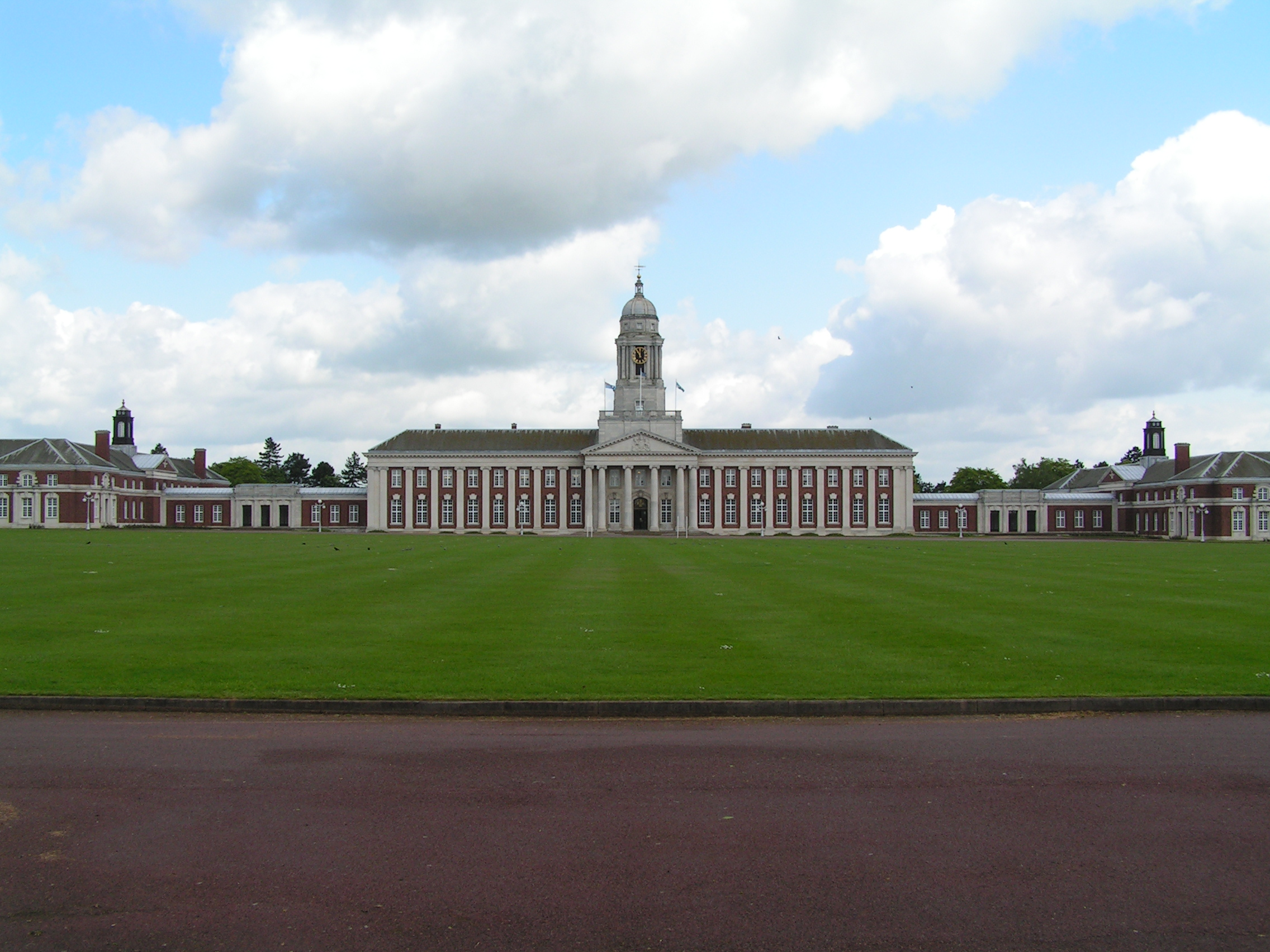
RAF College Cranwell

Thomas Gilbert Mahaddie was born in Leith, Scotland, on 19 March 1911. He came from a poor family. His father, Tam Mahaddie, worked whatever jobs he could find after serving with the Gordon Highlanders in the Great War. His mother was a seamstress, and sewed all his clothes in his younger days, but she died when he was still quite young. He left school at the age of 13 and got a job working for an Edinburgh grocer, but soon became interested in the possibility of being an apprentice craftsman for the fledgling Royal Air Force. He applied for the RAF Halton Aircraft Apprenticeship in 1927, and got it. On 9 January 1928 he was one of 305 boys selected who formed the 17th entry into the program at RAF Halton. It was a three-year program which provided technical training, military training and room and board to the boys, while generating much needed specialist groundcrew for the RAF. In December 1930 he was accepted into the RAF and posted to RAF College Cranwell as a 'metal rigger'. In one year he had attained the rank of leading aircraftman, making him eligible to volunteer for pilot training. He did so, but remained at Cranwell for two more years servicing aircraft. Finally in October 1933 he was given a transfer to RAF Hinaidi in Baghdad, Iraq where he was accepted for aircrew training.

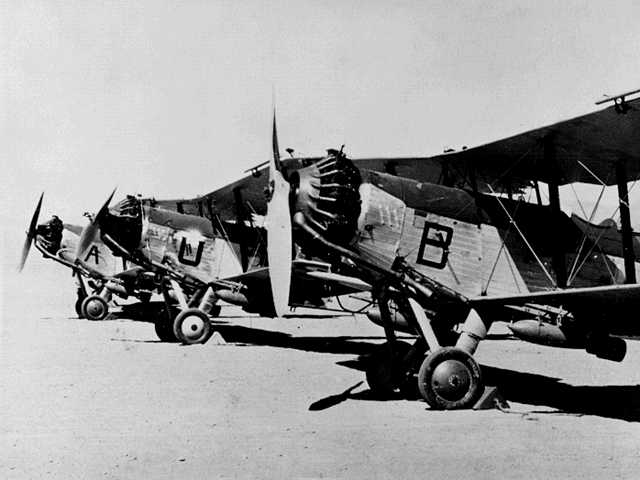
Westland Wapitis in Iraq

Mahaddie was posted to No. 4 Squadron FTS, Abu Suweir, Egypt in August 1934 and commenced pilot instruction while flying Avro 504Ns. He earned his wings 13 June 1935 and was promoted sergeant pilot. He returned to RAF Hinaidi and joined A Flight No. 55 Squadron flying Westland Wapitis. He remained there for two years. It was at this time that he acquired a horse, a blue roan Arabian which he named "Hamish". His fellow airmen remarked upon a distinct resemblance between the sergeant pilot and the horse, which Mahaddie protested against strongly as being an insult to the horse. They soon were referring to the Scotsman as "Hamish", and the name stuck. In 1937 he returned to England, transferring to No. 77 Squadron.

== Flying in the RAF ==
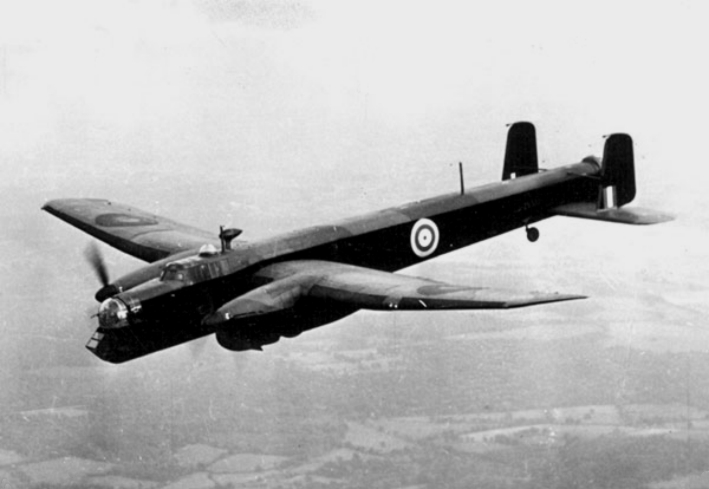
A Whitley medium bomber like the one Mahaddie and Wood crashed at Driffield Air Field

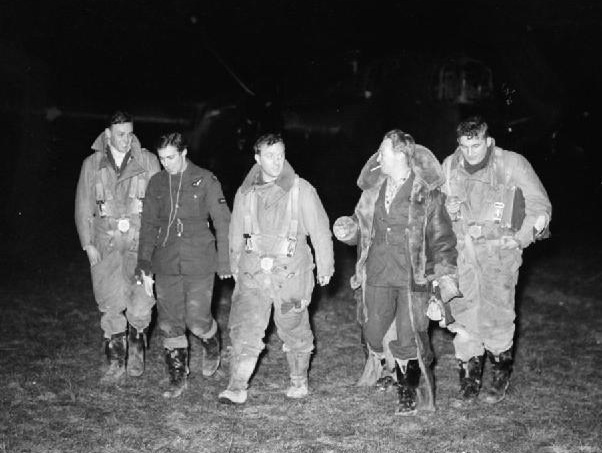
Mahaddie (in full length coat) walks off the airfield with his crew following an operation over the continent, 1940

In 1937 Mahaddie was sent back to England and posted at No. 77 Squadron at Honington. There he flew Whitley bombers from Driffield in Yorkshire. He was commissioned pilot officer 1 April 1937. The following year he was involved in an accident while completing a night flying training exercise. On 24 November Whitley K8963 crashed at the fringe of the Driffield airfield. Mahaddie had been piloting the aircraft, assisted by co-pilot Peter Rodney Wood. The 27-year-old Mahaddie struggled clear of the wrecked aircraft. As it started to burn he attempted to return to reach Wood, and had to be restrained from attempting to rescue his companion. His 22-year-old co-pilot was trapped in the wreckage and died in the fire. Mahaddie was taken to York Military Hospital for treatment of a number of injuries he suffered. An inquest held regarding the accident found no wrongdoing by the pilots.

The Second World War broke out in September 1939. Initially the bomber force was used in a timid manner. Mahaddie was involved in a number of bombing missions which he termed "ineffective". Two young pilots Mahaddie met while at 77 Squadron who went on to have distinguished careers were Jimmy Marks and Leonard Cheshire. On the first night of the war his squadron was sent to drop leaflets over the Ruhr. Early wartime operations for No. 77 Squadron's Whitleys included reconnaissance flights, leaflet "raids" over Germany and attacks on easily reached coastal targets. On 1 April 1940 he received his commission as an officer. In May 1940 with the German invasion into France Mahaddie flew raids against the advancing German columns, and completed a total of 23 operations during the Dunkirk period between 10 May and 29 June. With the exception of the raid led by Marks against German forces near Rotterdam, the raids had little impact on events, and Mahaddie was disappointed in their effectiveness. The only other mission he felt had been effective early in the war was his group's raid against Stavanger, Norway, where they destroyed a number of hangars the Germans had been making use of at the airfield during the Norway campaign. As Mahaddie recalled, what the group lacked was the ability to navigate accurately enough to reach the target in strength, and the ability to carry the weight of bombs necessary to destroy the target once they got there.

== Training crews at Kinloss ==
After surviving his first tour in July 1940 Mahaddie was assigned officer instructor at RAF Kinloss in Scotland. He served with No. 19 Operational Training Unit RAF, still flying the Whitely. The goal at Kinloss was to take pilots, navigators, wireless operators, bombardiers and air-gunners, all arriving from their respective basic training stations, and sort themselves out into crews of five, before starting their 12 to 14 weeks course of operational training. Mahaddie worked to meld them together into functioning crews. He proved to be excellent at training crews, and over the next two years he rose to the rank of squadron leader. Frustrated in no longer flying combat missions, pilots who returned to visit whom he had trained gave him the sense that things in the operational squadrons had changed since he had last been flying ops. For his service at Kinloss he was awarded the Air Force Cross (AFC), a non-combat award that Mahaddie sarcastically referred to as his "Avoiding Flak Cross."

== With the Pathfinders ==
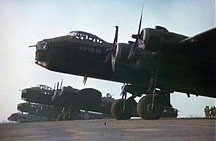
The large, four engine Stirlings on the tarmac, England, 1942

In August 1942 Mahaddie finally was granted his request to transfer to an operational squadron. For his second combat tour he was chosen to join a newly formed group called the Pathfinder Force. Normally Bomber Command crews were considered to complete a tour of combat flying after completing 30 sorties. In the Pathfinder Force crews initially were required to complete 60 sorties to complete a tour. With only 30 percent of crews reaching the end of their tours alive after 30 sorties, the Pathfinder Force was asking for a marked commitment from those who joined them. Made up entirely of experienced pilots, Mahaddie was one of the most experienced among them. Since he had been flying for four years before the outbreak of the war, he had 3,000 flying hours under his belt, along with 36 combat sorties from his first tour. He was assigned to No. 7 Squadron at Oakington. Mahaddie's second tour of operations began on the night of 17/18 August 1942, flying the huge four-engined Stirling in a raid against Flensburg.

The Pathfinder Force was made up of all experienced crews. The primary purpose was to navigate successfully to the target and mark it in advance of the main bomber force. There had been a significant amount of resistance within Bomber Command against the formation of the Pathfinder Force. Commanders such as Harris were adamant that there should be no elite unit inside Bomber Command, but proponents such as Group Captain Sidney Bufton prevailed. Harris argued that if a Target Finding Force was formed, each group should have their own squadron, but with the intervention of Air Chief Marshal Charles Portal, the Chief of the Air Staff, and the direct involvement of Prime Minister Winston Churchill, this idea was rejected as well. The five Groups of bomber command were each required to contribute a squadron of aircraft with crews to make up the PFF. The contributions of the bomber groups were as follows: No. 3 Group gave No. 7 Squadron flying Stirlings, No. 4 Group gave No. 35 Squadron flying Halifaxes, No. 5 Group gave No. 83 Squadron in Avro Lancasters while No. 1 Group gave No. 156 Squadron flying the Vickers Wellington. The fifth squadron, No. 109 Squadron was a special duty Wireless Intelligence unit which flew a mixture of aircraft and was given the task of jamming of German radio beams and developing wireless and navigational aides for Bomber Command. Thus the PFF initially comprised a mixture of aircraft types, with resultant operational difficulties.

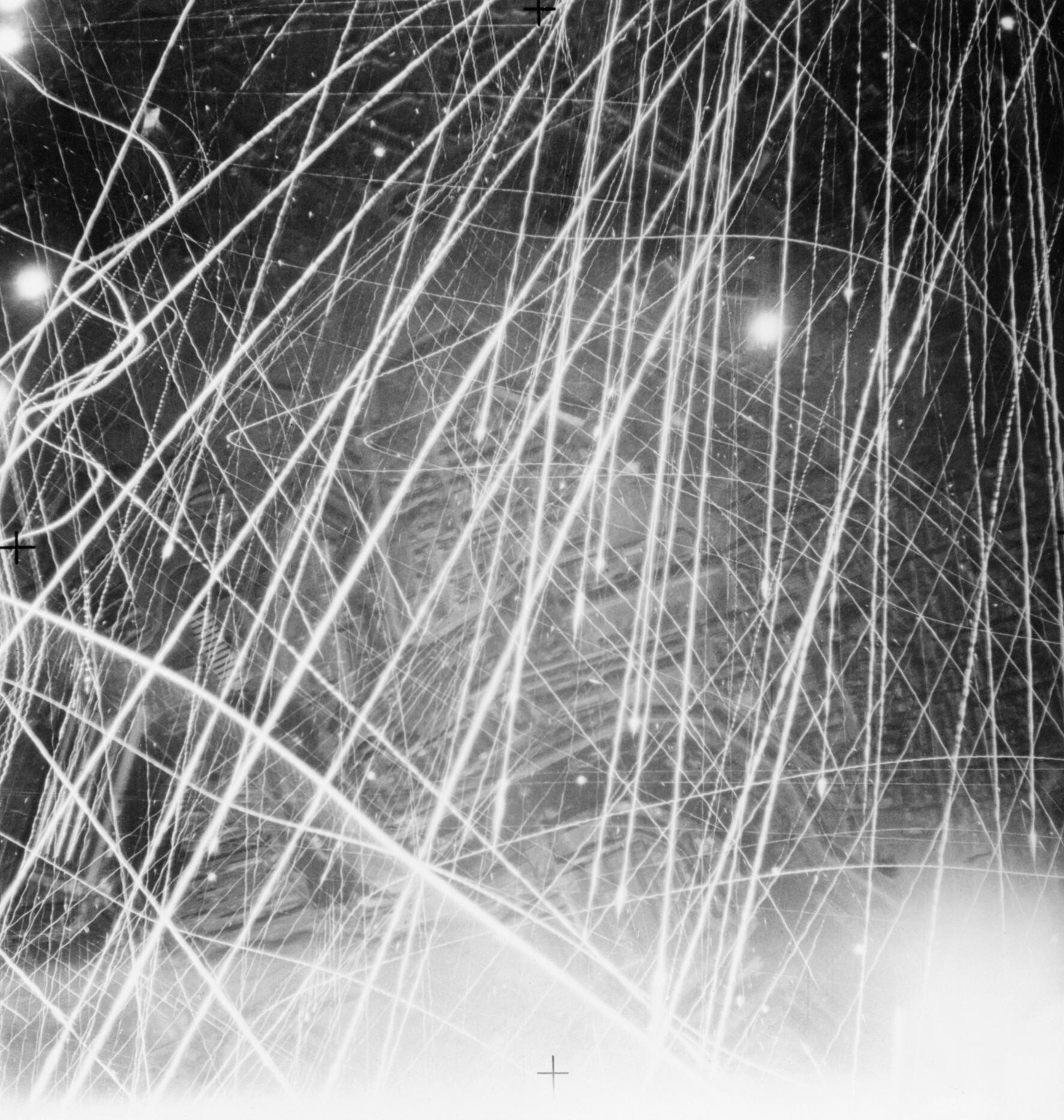
Tracer fire from German flak over occupied Europe

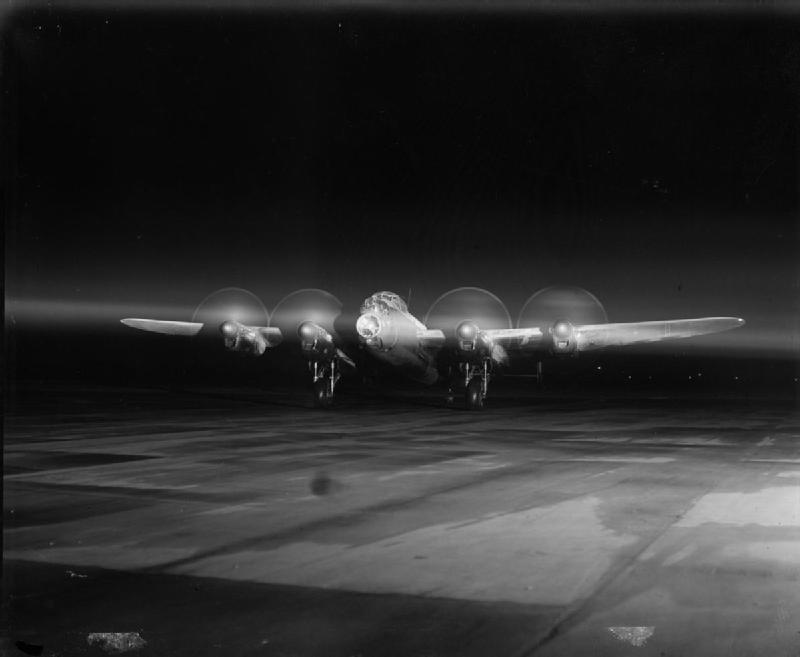
A Lancaster warms up its engines prior to a raid

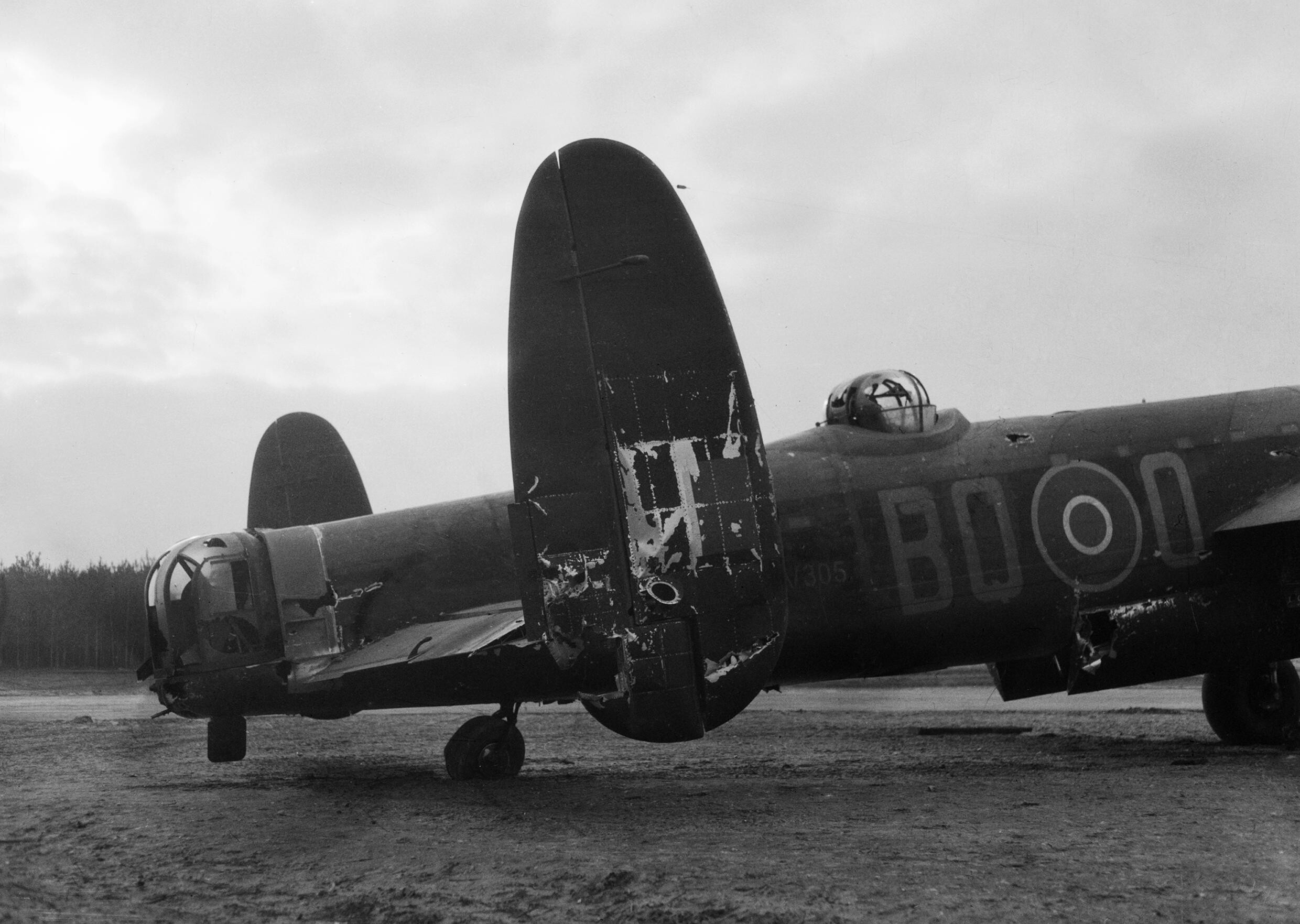
Damage to a Lancaster suffered in an attack by a German night fighter

Initially the four squadron force was sent out to attack targets just as any other bomber force. The group began true Pathfinder raids, dropping marking flares for the main bomber force, in October 1942. The first marker raid was to Krefeld on 2 October 1942. On a number of these raids Mahaddie was the lead bomber, tasked with dropping the first flares over the target. Mahaddie was twice Mentioned in Despatches in 1942. On 1 December 1942 Mahaddie was promoted to wing commander. By the Frankfurt raid on 3 December Mahaddie had completed his fiftieth operation. Over a period of the next eight weeks he was awarded the AFC, a Distinguished Service Order, the Czechoslovak War Cross 1939 and the Distinguished Flying Cross. Each had to be wetted by his squadron mates in typical RAF fashion, all on Mahaddie's tab. The various citations included phrases such as, "consistently attacked heavily defended targets with coolness and determination often in adverse weather", "powers of leadership of a very high order", and, "unflagging enthusiasm has had an inspiring effect on his comrades". It is likely that four awards in eight weeks was an RAF record. Mahaddie called it "the most expensive period of my career."

The Cologne raid of 1/2 February 1943 nearly brought Mahaddie's RAF career to an end. After releasing his target marking flares, the cloud cover that had been providing some protection that night broke up, and his aircraft was hit with flak. At nearly the same time his aircraft was attacked by a Ju 88 night-fighter, which raked its fuselage with cannon fire. Mahaddie initiated a diving turn to starboard, which resulted in the aircraft slipping into a steep, violent diving turn. Altitude was being lost at an alarming rate, and he realized he had lost lateral control of the aircraft. As they were diving under full power, Mahaddie made a grab for the throttle controls to pull them back. Fortunately, he only reached the two port throttles, and as he brought back power on them the aircraft leveled off. The instrument panel had been wrecked, the rear turret was put out of action and the Stirling's intercom system was knocked out. The mid-upper gunner, wireless operator and bomb aimer were all wounded, most of the compasses and navigational equipment were destroyed and the aileron controls were severed. According to gunner Bob Pointer, "the skipper was fighting with the aircraft. Having had the aileron controls badly mangled by the cannon shells he could only fly the aircraft by varying the power of the engines." He attempted to regain the altitude lost and came up through a cloud bank to realize they were headed east instead of west. By manipulating the power on the four engines he was able to lurch the aircraft back toward home. Flight Sergeant Stewart treated the wounds of the three injured crew members. Meanwhile, using star sightings and the plane's astro-compass, navigator "Tommy" Thompson was able to provide Mahaddie with a bearing back to base, if he could control the aircraft. Reaching the wing root with a flashlight and some wire, the flight engineer was able to jury rig a splice over the airloin wires, giving Mahaddie partial control of "C" Charlie, and he set course for home." However, their troubles were not over. Half way to the coast a second night fighter located the aircraft and closed, but Mahaddie was able to evade and shake him off, though the splicing of the ailerons did not hold up to his maneuvers and for a time he was limited to controlling direction with the throttle controls again. The next morning revealed the aircraft had taken 174 cannon shell hits. Said Mahaddie, "We went out flying C-Charlie, and came back flying C-Colander." Shells had passed through the cockpit on either side of Mahaddie's seat, making a mess of the instruments. One round punched through the armour plate below the pilot, but the parachute Mahaddie was using as a seat cushion absorbed the rest of the round's energy, leaving a mark on the pilot's buttock "no bigger than the size of a sixpence". Lucky to have survived, he said the event may have just proved the ancient Scot axiom "The deil looks after his ain!"

Mahaddie kept flying missions into March, but at 58 missions, two short of his stint, Group Commander Don Bennett called him up from No. 7 Squadron to his staff headquarters at Huntington as "Group Training Inspector", a position Bennett had created. Angered over being promoted out of the squadron, he stated later he had been resentful toward Bennett for sometime afterwards, all the more so as on their next mission with their new skipper the aircraft was lost and the entire crew killed. They had been an effective crew, and were due to attend an investiture at Buckingham Palace where between them they were to have received 11 decorations. Only Mahaddie remained alive for the ceremony.

== No. 8 Group Headquarters Staff ==
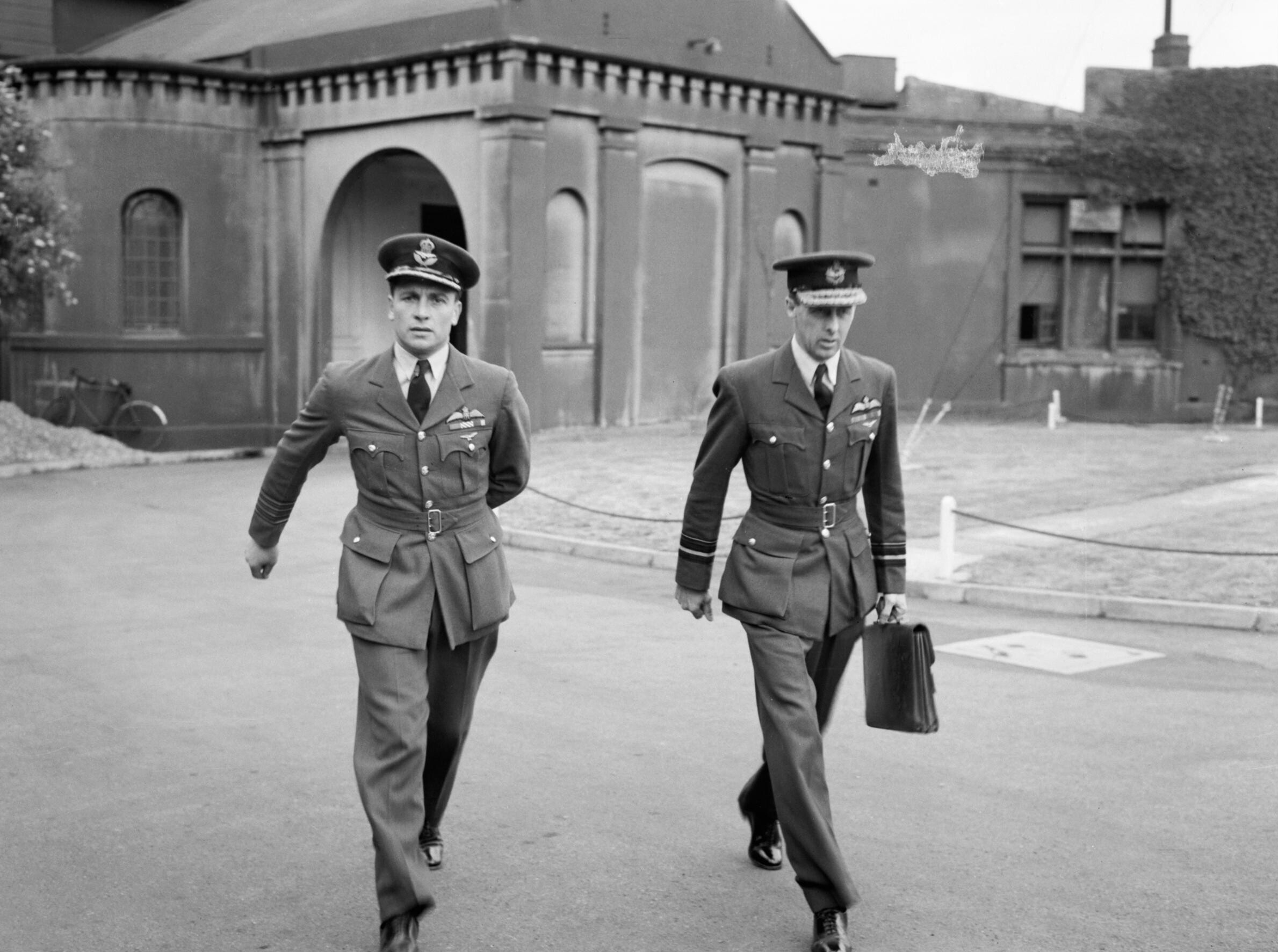
Group Captain J H Searby, the Command Navigation Officer, and Air Vice-Marsal D C T Bennett, Air Officer Commanding No. 8 Group (PFF)

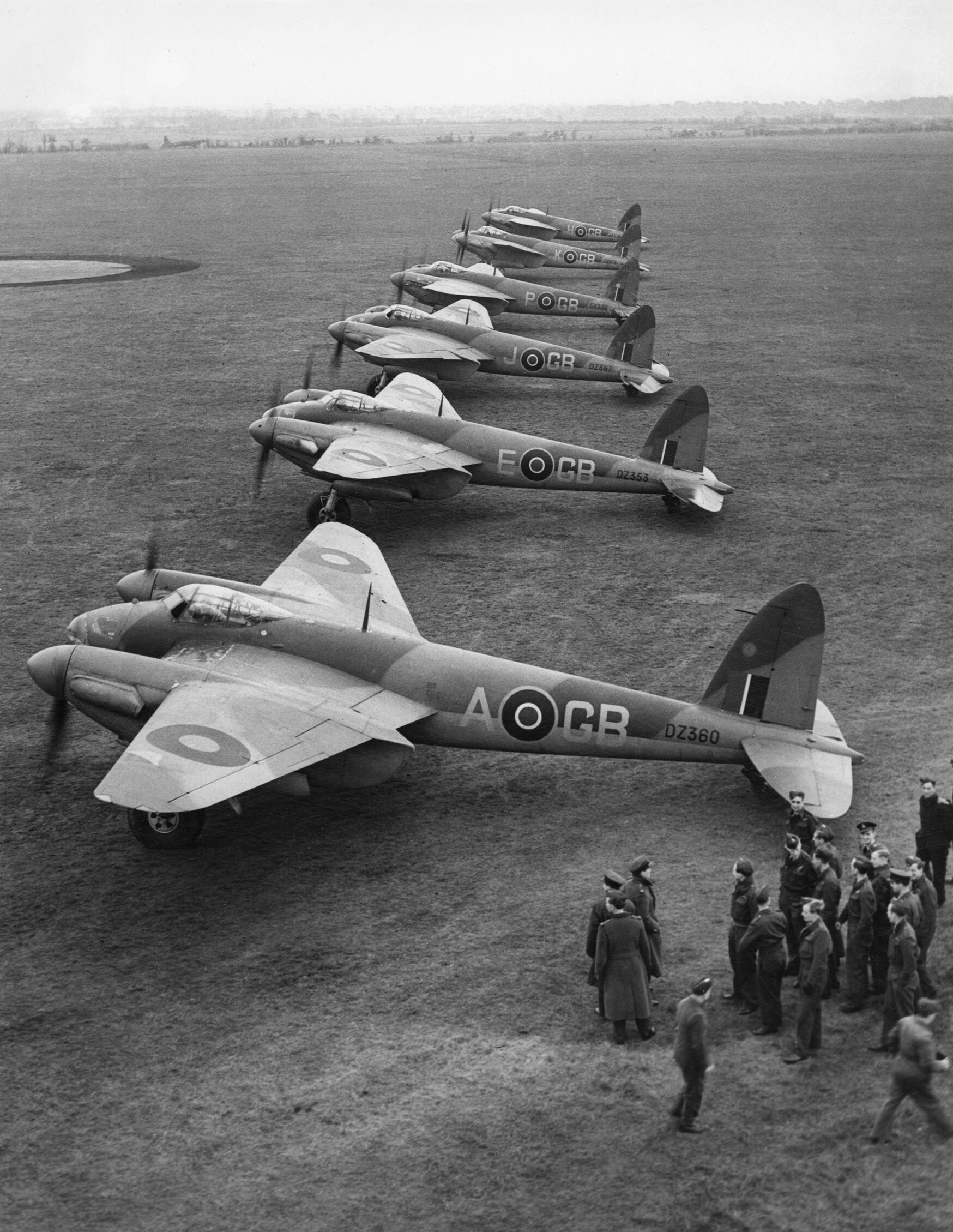
Mosquitos of 105 Squadron making up a part of the Pathfinder Force in December, 1942

On 23 March 1943 Mahaddie was promoted to group captain and assigned to No. 8 (PFF) Group Headquarters. He was taken off operational flying and made "Group Training Inspector" for PFF commander Don Bennett. The quality of the aircrews the Pathfinder Force was receiving had fallen off markedly since the group's initial formation, with some Groups using the PFF as a means to ship out officers facing courtmartial and other problem crews. Bennett tasked Mahaddie with fixing the problem. He was on his own as to how he was to accomplish the finding of crews to replace the group's losses. He also had a hand in their training. The new role meant he would be recruiting crews for the Pathfinders from operational squadrons whose commanding officers were not particularly interested in having their best crews recruited. It was a job Mahaddie became notoriously successful at.

As "Group Training Inspector" he regularly visited operational squadrons, ostensibly to lecture aircrews on the changing tactics and techniques employed by the Pathfinders. Before visiting a station, he would have already identified crews that he felt were candidates for the PFF. His small staff had reviewed the aiming point photographs shot from the aircraft on each mission. In recruiting aircrews Mahaddie was looking for accuracy and daring. The most critical part of a bombing mission was the bombing run. To drop accurately a bomber could not fly evasively. He had to fly straight and level over the target area till the bomb aimer called "bombs gone", then hold his line of flight another several seconds for the automatic photoflash and the aiming point picture taken by the night camera, all completed at the one point in the trip where search lights and antiaircraft fire were the most intense. Aircraft which had consistently dropped their bombs on the target were noted by his staff. Mahaddie would then call up the air base and ask for the name of the pilot of the aircraft.

In Mahaddie's talks he stressed the importance of navigation to reach the target, the use of special equipment such as Gee, H2S and Oboe, and the methods being used to confuse and confound the air defenses over Germany. These were topics of great interest to the pilots. In his talk he would always include two example missions where the Pathfinders failed. In both cases it was Mahaddie who was the lead bomber and who had made the error. The first he called "Hamish's shame" and the second he called "Mahaddie's folly", and he would speak of them not only as a guide as what not to do, but as an encouragement for them to see that if he could make it in the Pathfinders, then perhaps they could too. He admitted later that he used his lecture tour as a pretext to get onto the airbase and meet the pilots he had already identified. In the evening he would visit the pubs the aircrews frequented, and speak with the pilots individually and privately. Then, if the pilot wished and his crew agreed, they would apply to be transferred to the Pathfinder Force. Next a certain amount of back and forth between the air wing commander and Mahaddie would ensue, but Mahaddie had the support he needed and would inevitably get the transfer secured. The crew would be sent to RAF Warboys and start their training as a pathfinder crew. Through this, and other techniques, Mahaddie recruited thousands of the most highly regarded Bomber Command aircrew to the Pathfinders.

In 1944 Mahaddie and a number of other senior officers from Bomber Command were "seconded" to the Eighth Air Force to brief them on the navigational and directional techniques in use by the Pathfinder Force. Bomber Command also hoped to sway the Americans to join their efforts with those of Bomber Command in their night time attacks upon Germany. The Americans held faith in their Norden bombsight, and believed that daylight bombing was the only way to accurately strike at and destroy the target. Bomber Command believed in dropping a large concentration of bombs on the target to destroy it, made use of the cover of night to help protect their aircraft and used navigational aids and the Pathfinder Force to accurately hit and destroy their targets. In this assignment Mahaddie came to know Eight Air Force commander Jimmy Doolittle of Doolittle Raid fame, and immediately took a keen liking to him. Mahaddie had many discussions with 8th Air Force officers both during and after the war over the conduct of the air war over Europe. Doolittle returned the friendship, referring to Mahaddie as "Scotty", but never wavered from his commitment to the American concept of high altitude, precision, daylight bombing.

== Commander Warboys ==
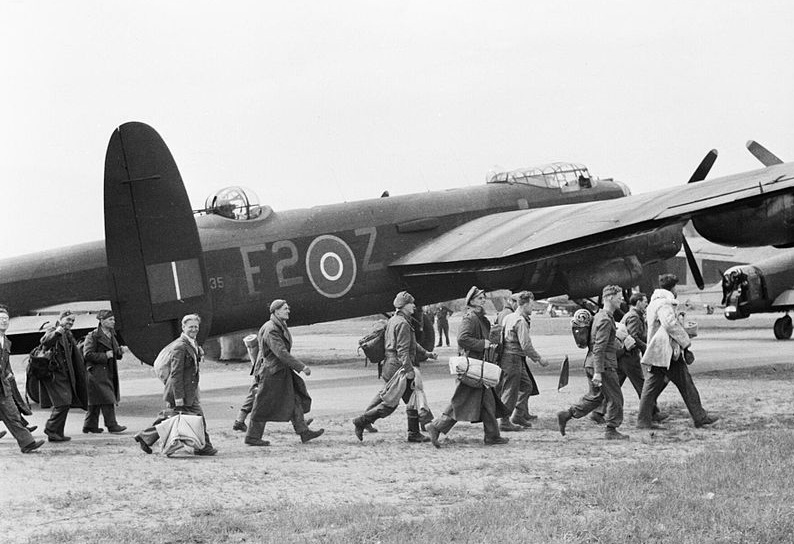
RAF PoWs prepare to board Lancasters for the return flight from Lübeck to England

Mahaddie's final assignment during the war came 24 July 1944 when he was made Officer Commanding at RAF Warboys, the airfield that was home for the Pathfinder Force Training Unit. He took over the command from Group Captain J. H. Searby, a pilot whom Mahaddie had earlier recruited to the Pathfinder Force, famous for being the Master Bomber on the Peenemünde raid. The unit trained aircrew on the Avro Lancaster and the de Havilland Mosquito. Mahaddie was again Mentioned in Despatches on 1 January 1945. The last wartime sortie he flew was in leading a flight of 60 Lancasters to repatriate RAF PoWs held at Lübeck.

== With the RAF after the war ==
Mahaddie continued to serve in the RAF for 13 years after the war in Europe came to an end in May 1945. In June 1945 he was appointed to command No. 111 Wing, a transport wing stationed in Germany. This was followed by a spell at the Staff College, Haifa, Israel in 1947. His postwar duties also included two tours of duty at the Air Ministry, as Officer Commanding the Flying Wing at RAF Binbrook, Lincolnshire England where his wing made first operational use of the Canberra, the first RAF jet bomber. He was awarded a Bar to his AFC on 7 June 1951 for his work bringing the Canberra into service. Later he was Station Commander at RAF Sylt, Germany and then RAF Butzweilerhof, near Cologne, Germany. He retired in March 1958 with the rank of group captain.

== Post RAF career ==
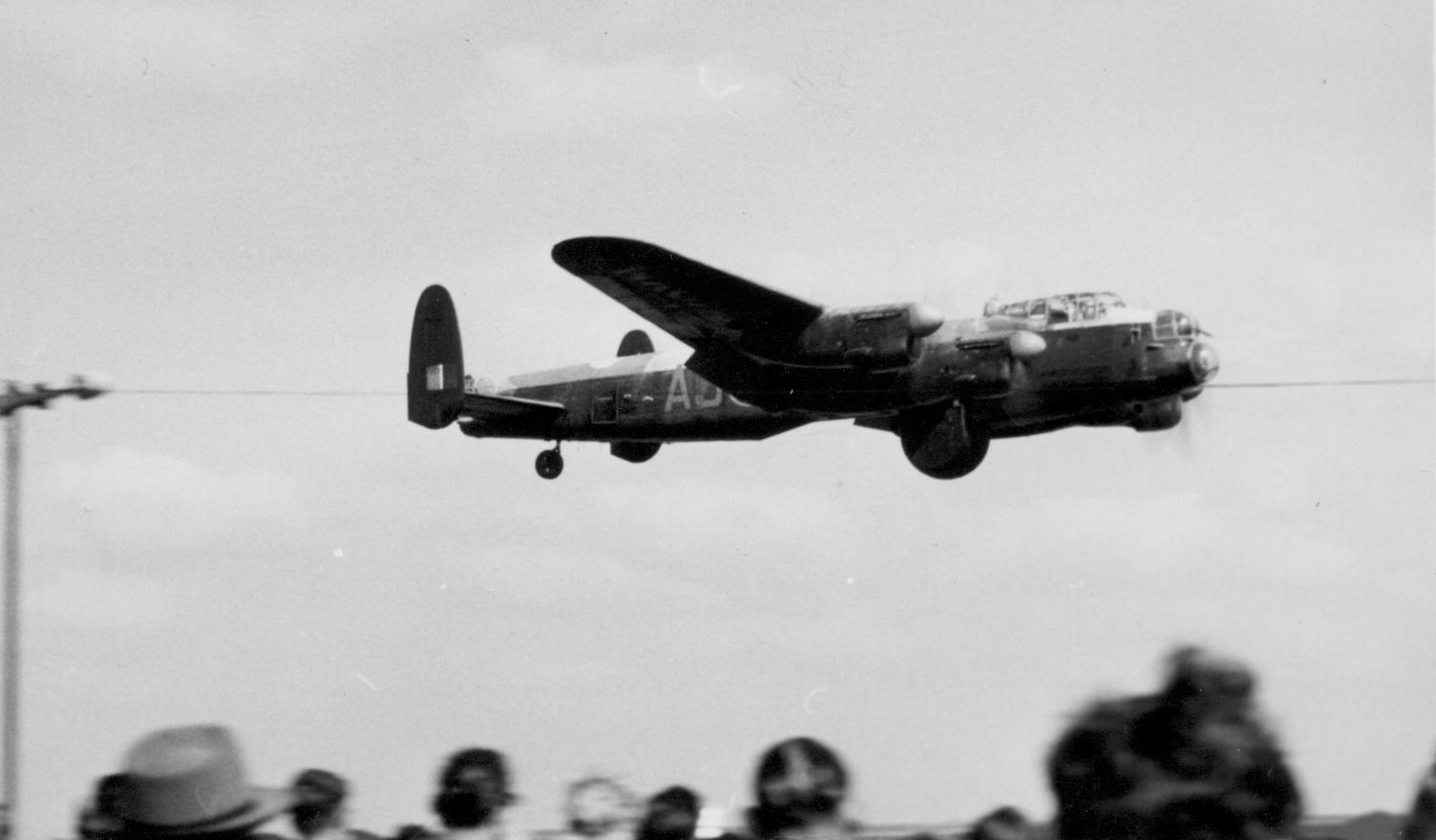
Avro Lancaster procured by 'Hamish' Mahaddie for the film The Dam Busters, 1954

Following his career in the RAF, Mahaddie worked as an electronics consultant for the Armed Forces. While still in the service he had located Lancasters for the film The Dam Busters in 1955. Many film projects from the fifties were shot in black and white, and their producers were able to make use of wartime footage taken by official sources of the armed services, but for close shots and interiors the aircraft were needed. Mahaddie was able to procure them.

After he retired from the military he became involved in a great number of films. This developed following his involvement in the film 633 Squadron (1964). Running into difficulty getting aircraft for the project, one of the production people asked about if there was anyone familiar with Mosquitos, and Mahaddie's name came up. He ended up acquiring 11 Mosquitos for the picture, and the aircrews to fly them. He soon became known amongst the film industry as a resource, both in the procurement of aircraft, maintenance teams and aircrew for the films and in consulting in the realism in their portrayals of the RAF. After the filming of 633 Squadron was completed Mahaddie purchased one of the aircraft, Mosquito RS712. He used it to fly back and forth to various locations before selling it 8 years later in 1972. Other films Mahaddie worked on include Operation Crossbow (1965) and Mosquito Squadron, the 1969 sequel to 633 Squadron.

Another major project for Mahaddie was the James Bond film You Only Live Twice (1967). For the film's special weapons sequence he asked Ken Wallis, a former RAF Wing Commander and the designer of an autogyro, to demonstrate his machine for the movie's producer. Said Wallis "The next thing I knew Group Captain Hamish Mahaddie, the famous RAF Pathfinder chap, who was the aviation consultant for EON Productions, was on the phone asking me to bring one of my Autogyros down to Pinewood Studios. He said, "It’s to do with a Bond movie." Speaking with Wallis afterwards, Mahaddie described his successful audition: "You started the engine up and it made a terrible noise that echoed round all the buildings. Off the brakes and away you disappeared in a cloud of dust heading straight for the railway sleepers. Then out of the dust you came, and flew straight up into the blue sky... and you were in the Bond movie." Mahaddie gave Wallis' autogyro its nickname. Part of an old RAF tradition was to refer to anyone in the RAF with the last name of Wallace or Wallis as "Nellie", after the turn of the century stage singer Nellie Wallace. Thus, on the James Bond set Wallis' autogyro came to be known as "Little Nellie".

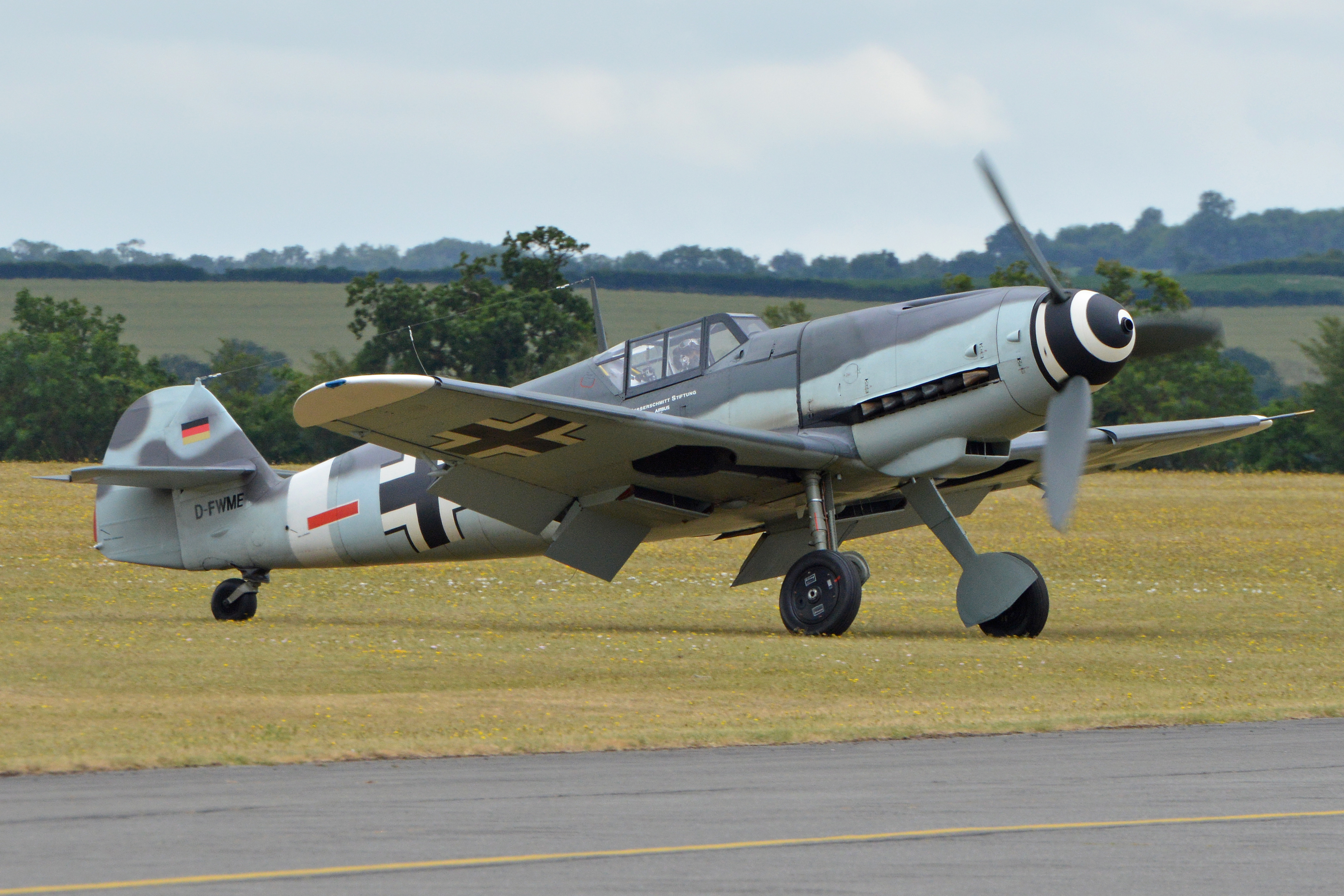
Bf 109 purchased by Mahaddie from Spain for the film Battle of Britain

Mahaddie's largest film related project was his work on the film Battle of Britain (1969). This film was produced by Benjamin Fisz, a Polish expatriate who had flown with the RAF as a Spitfire pilot during the war. The film was to be shot in Panavision in full color, making all archived film materials taken during the war unacceptable. Twenty years after the war, it was not certain that the aircraft could be located and gathered together for the film. It was thought the German aircraft did not even exist. In the fall of 1965 Fisz met with Mahaddie to ask if he could find aircraft to form an "RAF" and "Luftwaffe" that would be convincing on the screen. In the next few weeks Mahaddie and his company Spitfire Productions Ltd located 160 Spitfires worldwide, with 107 in England, many of these mounted on struts for displays outside airfields. Hurricanes were harder to come by. It would take Mahaddie two and a half years to assemble his RAF and Luftwaffe from all corners of the globe. He managed to persuade the RAF to lend many of its non-flight worthy aircraft as static airfield dressing. In addition to this he obtained 9 airworthy Spitfires and 3 airworthy Hurricanes, but all but one of the airworthy Spitfires obtained were later models, with bubble canopies and other physical differences from the Supermarine Spitfire Mk I that was used to fight the battle.

RAF Henlow was the film's base of operations for the restoration and modification of the Hurricanes and Spitfires, and it was here that the various marks of Spitfire were converted to resemble the 1940 variant. Mahaddie's big coup was discovering that the Spanish Air Force was still using licence built Messerschmitt 109 fighters as trainers and Heinkel 111 bombers as transports, ironically both now powered using Rolls-Royce engines. He persuaded the Spanish air force to co-operate in the filming of Battle of Britain. This provided the film with its "Luftwaffe" aircraft. All told he acquired the use of 115 British and German designed aircraft.

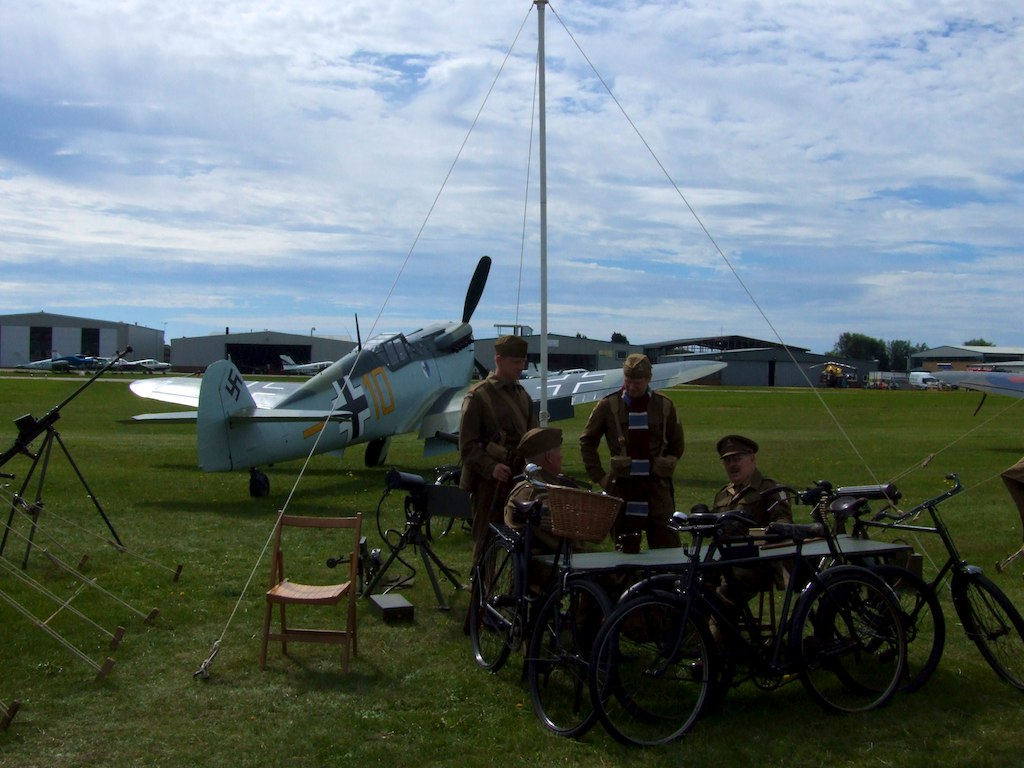
Bf 109 and men dressed as British officers and enlisted men during a break during the filming of Battle of Britain, 1968

Maintaining a large fleet of vintage aircraft and keeping them all serviceable for the filming schedule was a mammoth task in itself. Here he was aided by John Simpson and his civilian engineers at Simpson Aero Services, Elstree. Simpson Aero Services was one of the first civilian aircraft maintenance companies to specialise in the maintenance and operation of former combat aircraft from the Second World War. This was at a time before widespread interest in such aircraft. John "Tubby" Simpson was an expert on the Rolls-Royce Merlin engine, and daily during filming he was traveling all over the UK in order to get unserviceable parts repaired and back on the film's fleet of ageing fighters.

Another problem for the film was the need for a group of experienced pilots to fly the aircraft. Mahaddie made a request to the Ministry of Defence asking for a select group of pilots to be seconded to the film company, the pilots preferably coming from the Central Flying School. After some deliberation the Ministry of Defence came up with a list of ten flying instructors, all of whom had many hours experience of fighter type aircraft. They were led by Wing Commander George Elliot from RAF HQ Flying Training Command. A group of pilot instructors from Spain were also used, as were a group of ex-service pilots from the United States. These men enabled the film to have its spectacular dogfight sequences, using authentic aircraft flown by capable pilots well versed in the aggressive use of their aircraft.

Among his other consulting projects, Mahaddie worked on the television series Pathfinders, the movies The Heroes of Telemark (1965), Patton (1970), A Bridge Too Far (1977) and Soldier of Orange (1977). In all Mahaddie received formal crediting in the acknowledgements of 15 films, receiving screen credit as either T.G. Mahaddie or more frequently Hamish Mahaddie. However he procured aircraft and provided consultation services in several more. In addition, Mahaddie appeared in the 1973 documentary The World at War as a commentator on the bombing campaign against Germany.

== Later in life ==
Late in life Mahaddie traveled the world giving a talk he called "The Bombing Years" about the air war in Europe. He presented at such venues as the Royal Aeronautical Society, RAF Association meetings, the Smithsonian, the Air Force Academy, the war colleges and at veteran reunions. He also spoke at commemorative ceremonies and wrote a memoir about his time in the RAF. In 1990 he traveled from England to Nanton, Alberta to speak at the ceremonial dedication of the Ian Bazalgette Memorial Lancaster at the Bomber Command Museum of Canada. Upon his arrival at Nanton, Hamish's well deserved reputation as an out-going character and gentleman soon became apparent as the 79-year-old quickly became friends with all, particularly a number of the ladies, who he insisted must have been, "child brides." During his speech Hamish recalled how Squadron Leader Bazalgette had, "plagued him" on a weekly basis with letters and telephone calls, "begging" to be put back on operations with the Pathfinder Force, "which I have always regretted doing, because sadly he was killed on the occasion when he won his V.C." As he reached the end of his speech, Hamish lamented the deaths of so many thousands of the Pathfinders that he had personally recruited, fine young men much like Ian Bazalgette.

As relayed to a friend late in his life, he reflected: "My saddest reflection concerns my own crew. When I attend reunions and I see how happy crews come together, even after 40 years, can meet and let the years roll away, I am in deep envy of these happy people. And this is only compounded when I consider my misery at how I was pitchforked from my squadron and crew to become a staff officer at Bennett's headquarters. It is of little importance to me now to be told, and I accept it really, that the Staff period I spent at Headquarters and later at Warboys was a much more important aspect of my war effort. I did not think so at the time, and I have even more difficulty in accepting it now."

== Personal life ==
Mahaddie was married twice, and twice widowed. He had two sons by his first marriage. Mahaddie was a charming man. Lieutenant General Reg "Shady" Lane, the former commanding officer of 405 Squadron RCAF who had served under Mahaddie at No. 111 Wing recalled, "Hamish had a fabulous personality – an extrovert of extroverts. He could charm anybody." The character of the man Mahaddie is reflected in many of the obituaries of the men who served with him. For Charles Lofthouse, the Telegraph reads: "Lofthouse had been hand-picked as a flight commander by Group Captain Hamish Mahaddie, the Pathfinders' well-known "talent scout"; and, as with so many of Mahaddie's selections, Lofthouse proved a winner, until he was himself shot down." For Roy Elliott, Mahaddie is mentioned as an "ebullient Scot whom Don Bennett styled his horse thief." Mahaddie was known for the bowler hats he liked to wear, and for his Scottish banter. He had many discussions with Eighth Air Force officers over the bombing campaign against Germany, both during the war and after. Mahaddie was always cordial and easy to speak with, but he loved to tweak the Americans when these topics came up. Said Mahaddie: "I do like to take the piss out of them, frankly, and I do it with great skill, and low Scotch cunning". Said Lane, "Anyone who’s met Hamish Mahaddie will never forget him."

== Works ==
- Mahaddie, T.G. Hamish: the Memoirs of Group Captain T.G. Mahaddie DSO, DFC, AFC, CZMC, CENG, FRAeS. London: Ian Allan (1989).

== Awards ==
- United Kingdom: Distinguished Service Order
- United Kingdom: Distinguished Flying Cross (Note: Joint Citation reads: One night in February, 1943, Wing Commander Mahaddie, Flight Lieutenant Thompson and Flight Sergeant Stewart were captain, navigator and flight engineer respectively of an aircraft detailed to attack Cologne. Whilst over the target area the aircraft was hit by anti-aircraft fire and attacked by an enemy fighter. The bomber sustained much damage. The aileron control cables were severed, causing the aircraft to fall into a steep diving turn and the wireless apparatus and the inter communication system were rendered unserviceable. By skilful use of the engines, Wing Commander Mahaddie regained control and set course for home. With great promptitude, Flight Sergeant Stewart inspected the damage and, after reporting the position to his captain, rendered first aid to the wireless operator who had sustained a severe wound in the hand. Flight Sergeant Stewart then did all in his power to assist his captain in flying the aircraft back to base which was gamed at the estimated time due to the superb navigation of Flight Lieutenant Thompson. In the face of trying circumstances, these members of aircraft crew displayed great courage, skill, and initiative.)
- United Kingdom: Air Force Cross (Bar)
- Czechoslovakia: Czechoslovak War Cross 1939
- United Kingdom: 1939-1945 Star
- United Kingdom: War Medal 1939-1945
- United Kingdom: Defence Medal 1939–1945
- United Kingdom: Air Crew Europe Star
