= Through the Looking Glass (opera) =

21st-century opera by Alan John

- Chamber opera by Alan John
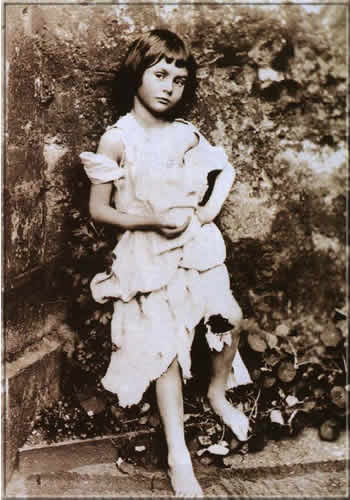
- Alice Liddell, on whose life the opera is based
- Librettist: Andrew Upton
- Language: English
- Based on: Through the Looking-Glass by Lewis Carroll
- Premiere: May 20, 2008; Malthouse Theatre, Melbourne

Through the Looking Glass is a chamber opera by the Australian composer Alan John to a libretto by Andrew Upton, based on Lewis Carroll's 1871 book and on the life of Alice Liddell, the girl for whom Carroll wrote the story's 1865 prequel, Alice's Adventures in Wonderland.

The work was commissioned by the Victorian Opera and the Malthouse Theatre in association with Opera Australia; it premiered on 20 May 2008 at the Merlyn Theatre (Malthouse Theatre). The performance time is approximately 70 minutes.

== Roles ==
Role	Voice type	Premiere cast, 20 May 2008 Conductor: Richard Gill
Alice (both the young girl in the story and the adult Alice Liddell)	mezzo-soprano	Dimity Shepherd
Lewis Carroll, Train Driver, The Red King, Humpty Dumpty, The White Knight	tenor	David Hobson
Tiger Lily, Passenger, The White Queen, Pudding, Ensemble	soprano	Margaret Haggart
Rose, The Red Queen, Passenger, Sheep, Unicorn, Ensemble	mezzo-soprano	Suzanne Johnston
Violet, Passenger, Tweedledee, The White King, Ensemble	tenor	Kanen Breen
Daisy, Guard, Tweedledum, Mutton; Ensemble	bass	Gary Rowley
Young Alice, Fawn		Stephanie Pidcock, Jacqueline Bathman, Dana Hehir, alternating with: Emilia Bertolini, Francesca Codd, Hayley Heath
Director		Michael Kantor
Set & costume design		Peter Corrigan
Lighting design		Paul Jackson
Dramaturge		Maryanne Lynch
Musical Preparation		David McSkimming
Assistant Conductor		Nicholas Carter
Assistant Director		Anna Tregloan

== Synopsis ==
Prologue – Young Alice, Alice, Lewis Carroll

"Alas, poor Alice; locked forever in a dream", sings Young Alice. Will she ever grow up? Lewis Carroll arrives and interrupts the reverie telling them that he has a book in which the story is written in a backside down and inside out way.

Scene 1 The Mirror – Alice, ensemble

Alice begins her journey into looking-glass world – she enters a tulgey wood where she is uncertain of what she is seeking. A chorus reminds her to beware the manxome foe with his vorpal blade and especially avoid the Jabberwock.

Scene 2 Garden of Live Flowers – Alice, Rose, Violet, Daisy, Tiger Lily

Alice moves through the garden of live flowers, each one of whom has a personal remark to make on her appearance. Alice's threat that she will pick the live flowers sends them into a panic which ends with the arrival of the Red Queen.

Scene 3 Red Queen – Alice, Red Queen, Young Alice

The Red Queen gives Alice firm advice on how to behave in life, including how one needs to run to keep up with things, which leads to the entry of three Young Alices, who explain that what appears to be a game of chess, might be moved through and how she will meet a White Knight and finally end up as Queen.

Scene 4 The Train – Guard, Alice, passengers, The Driver, Young Alice

Alice travels by train to the third square in spite of the wishes of the passengers to throw her from the train.

Scene 5 The Forest – Alice, Fawn

Jumping a brook, the train lands in a forest where things have no names. Alice struggles to remember her name as does a Fawn whom she meets, and who finally flees from her once it has remembered its name in case Alice might try to tame it.

Scene 6 Tweedledum & Tweedledee – Young Alice, Tweedledum, Tweedledee, Alice

The tulgey wood leads her on to the fourth square, the home of the Tweedles, where a massive battle is about to ensue. The arrival of a monstrous crow prevents the battle and Alice finds herself ...

Scene 7 The White Queen – Alice, The White Queen, Young Alice

... addressing the White Queen, who explains the difficulties of living backwards and how to believe in as many as six impossible things before breakfast. The Young Alices offer the advice that it is better to suffer now for crimes one might commit, to which Alice replies that she has never heard such a thing.

Scene 8 The River – Young Alice, Alice, Lewis Carroll, sheep

Alice, accompanied by Lewis Carroll and the Young Alices, embark on a boat journey on "a perfect summer's day". Alice leaning out of the boat trying to grasp the rushes and Carroll remembering how the story poured from him, while a sheep knits, unobserved by Alice.

Scene 9 Humpty Dumpty – Alice, Young Alice, Humpty Dumpty

Alice meets Humpty Dumpty ("Are you the Jabberwock?" asks Young Alice) who explains to her how words are very important and who also sings her his very disturbing song, "I sent a message to the fish."

Scene 10 The Battle – White King, Unicorn, Alice, Mutton, Pudding, Young Alice

Alice finds herself in a square where a picnic takes place. Alice is introduced to the food, oysters, a leg of mutton and a pudding. An argument breaks out amongst the picnickers over who eats what and how much until a voice calls out reminding them that they are deep in a tulgey wood. Is it the Jabberwock?

Scene 11 White Knight – White Knight, Alice

Alice, the mature woman, seeks permission from the White Knight to grow up. He captures her soul in a photograph.

Scene 12 Alice's Duet – Young Alice, Alice

The Young Alice and the grown-up Alice sing of memories of sunny days and "moving under sunny skies never seen by waking eyes."

== Reception ==
The work was placed on the syllabus of the Victorian Certificate of Education Theatre Studies program.
