= Jonah (1982 miniseries) =

- Based on: Jonah by Louis Stone
- Written by: Eleanor Witcombe
- Directed by: Eric Tayler
- Starring: Jonathan Sweet; Claire Crowther; Liddy Clark; Steve Bisley; June Salter; Mark Hembrow
- Country of origin: Australia
- Original language: English
- No. of episodes: 4

Production
- Producer: Alan Burke
- Running time: 60 minutes

Original release
- Network: ABC
- Release: 14 March – 4 April 1982

Jonah is a 1982 Australian mini series based on the novel of the same name by Louis Stone. It is about Jonah, leader of a street gang who goes into business.

The novel was published in 1911.

== Cast ==
- Jonathan Sweet as Jonah
- Claire Crowther as Ada
- Liddy Clark as Pinkey
- Doreen Warburton as Mrs. Yabsley
- Steve Bisley as Cook
- June Salter
- Mark Hembrow as Waxy
- Moya O'Sullivan
- Joseph Fürst as Hans Paach
- Colin Croft as Old Dad
- Ron Haddrick
- Jennifer Hagan
- Jane Harders
- Maggie Kirkpatrick
