= Robbery (1985 film) =

- DVD cover
- Inspired by: Great Bookie robbery
- Written by: Brian Dale
- Directed by: Michael Thornhill
- Starring: John Sheerin; Tony Rickards; Tim Hughes
- Music by: Glen Muirhead; Michael Walker
- Country of origin: Australia
- Original language: English

Production
- Producer: Michael Thornhill
- Cinematography: Peter Levy
- Editor: Denise Hunter
- Running time: 94 minutes
- Production companies: Edgecliff Film Group; Indian Pacific Films
- Budget: $865,000

Original release
- Release: 1986

Robbery is a 1985 Australian television film directed by Michael Thornhill inspired by the Great Bookie Robbery.

== Cast ==
- Simon Chilvers as Chief Superintendent Bill Sullivan
- Regina Gaigalas as Det. Inspector Joan Pearson
- Tim Hughes as Sergeant Shaw
- Rhys McConnochie as Michael Webster
- Richard Meikle as Major General
- Tony Rickards as Lt. Russ Stephenson
- John Sheerin as Major Bill Taylor
- Joe Spano as Noel Jenkins
- Peter Fisher as Williams
- Basil Clarke as Johnny Murphy
- Jonathan Sweet as Banks
- Reg Gillam as Police Commissioner
- Tina Bursill as Suzy

== Plot ==
Major Bill Taylor (John Sheerin), leader of a fictitious Australian SAS-like regiment, is in charge of a hush-hush training exercise that goes wrong and is made to take leave (and the section disbanded) while the dust settles. He has a meeting at a gentlemen's club with retired Lt. Russ Stephenson (Tony Rickards) who tells him about regular meet-ups of bookmakers at the Club where they quietly settle accounts, totalling millions of dollars. Taylor recruits Shaw, Banks, Peters and Williams (Tim Hughes, Jonathan Sweet, Stan Kouros and Peter Fisher), all ex-commandos and missing the action; they train for the heist which has been planned by Taylor.

Taylor and two others steal weapons from a gun shop while the others create diversions: blasting the door of an electricity substation and smashing jeweller's shop windows. They subsequently holdup a small city bank, "for working capital", but mostly as a training exercise.

Meanwhile, police chief Murray (Richard Meikle) is frustrated through getting no leads on suspected crime boss Michael Webster (Rhys McConnochie), suspecting a leak in his own office. He personally tasks attractive young D.I. Joan Pearson (Regina Gaigalas) to investigate Webster through his henchman, eligible bachelor Noel Jenkins (Joseph Spano), pledging her to secrecy on account of the likely informer.

Taylor's men break into the Club in the "wee small hours" of the race day and camp in the fire escape. Eight hours later the bookies' takings are delivered by security men, who are overpowered by Taylor and company, who make off with the loot. There is little sympathy shown by either police or crooks for the bookies, who are clearly understating their losses.

Murray is put in charge of the investigation, and the unnamed informer (Greg Curran), passes police intelligence to Webster. Pearson, who has begun sleeping with Jenkins, overhears and now has confirmation of the informer's existence.

Taylor is careful – when counting the money he abstracts bundles of sequential notes for destruction, the remainder (some $6 million) is to be warehoused overseas for several years, and in the meantime they are to act normally. Shaw, who is given the destruction job, surreptitiously pockets a bundle. His free-spending is noticed by the underworld; he is picked up by Jenkins and is tortured to death by Webster's men but reveals nothing.

Taylor and the remainder of his team are out for revenge. They break into Webster's hideout under the nose of a police stakeout, and not noticed by Webster's lookout (he is watching a movie — The FJ Holden). Leaving no trace, they execute the gang after extracting a confession to Shaw's murder, and dispose of the bodies in a blazing car explosion. They leave for a comfortable life overseas; the police are content to leave them alone.

== Production ==
It filmed July to August 1985. Thornhill later claimed the film was extremely successful internationally.

It was made for 2/6 (Note: An Australian expression, said as "two and sixpence" or "two and six", dating back to pre-decimalization days – 25 cents in the 1980s would maybe buy an icecream or a cheap cup of coffee.) – that was at a time when you could get much more interesting projects through the television system here than you can now. I'm pleased with Robbery. It's a film noir that people didn't understand here as a film noir. Its basic theme is the revenge of the underclass and what the French would call the Petit Bourgeoisie, and what we might here call the lower middle class who are led by a disgruntled leader. It's a kind of revenge film noir thing, and because it's in 4 to 3, 1.33 to 1, it's made for television and that means the framing's exactly right. So I think it stands up rather well, actually. It doesn't get shown much here. It does overseas. It's continually playing on cable systems in France and England. The French dubbing is fantastic. In French voices it's all that spivvy, mock ironic spivvy lower middle class petit bourgeoisie stuff, while the officers have École Nationale-type voices. It even actually went out on video in the States. I like it, I'm not ashamed of it, I think it's a nice little thing. But, because here it's seen as a B-genre thing, you've just got to put up with that here, roll with the punch, not bitch about it.

== Reception ==
Richard Glover of The Sydney Morning Herald gave the film a poor review, commenting on the tax payer funding: "Curiously, it is another Robbery (Monday on Channel 10) which represents the finest flowering of the tax concession scheme during last year's final boom. The robbery in both cases, of course, refers to that committed by the producers upon the Australian Taxation Department and in turn the Australian taxpayer." The Sun-Herald also panned the movie writing: "But to me Robbery, written by Brian Dale and produced and directed by Michael Thornhill, is more than just plain bad. It is also ugly, cynical, confusing and boring." The Age’s Barbara Hooks was also negative: "The cause of Australian television was set back 20 years last night with the screening of the telemovie Robbery (Channel 10, 8.30). As drama goes, it wasn't just a dog; it was a robber's dog." Cinema Papers' Marcus Breen was more positive, finishing: "It has too much boyish fantasy, and not enough of the cut and thrust of reality that distinguished Australian television shows like Division 4, Homicide, Matlock Police and Scales of Justice. It is merely an exciting, patchy thriller."

== Home media ==
Flashback Entertainment has released a DVD copy of the film, running time 91 minutes.
