= John Sheerin =

Australian actor

- Occupation: Actor
- Children: Eilish Sheerin

John Sheerin is an Australian actor. He played lead roles in the TV movie Robbery and the TV series Chances. Other screen roles include Joh's Jury and Perhaps Love. Sheerin also acted on stage, appearing in Byzantine Flowers in 1990 and Gunjies - Travelling in Haunted Country in 1993.

== Filmography ==
=== Film ===
- Robbery (TV movie, 1985) - Major Bill Taylor
- Two Friends (TV movie, 1986) as Dead Girl's Father
- Perhaps Love (TV movie, 1987) as Jack
- Joh's Jury (TV movie, 1993) as Dave

=== Television ===
- Bodyline (miniseries) (1984) as Bill Ponsford
- Chances (episodes 1–110) (1991-92) as Dan Taylor
- Naked: Stories of Men (episode 3: 'Blindside Breakaway") (1996)
- Federation (miniseries, part 3: "The Nation") (1998) as Voice
- The Adventures of Sam (animated series) (1999)
- Outriders (2001) as Mr Sullivan
- Home and Away (2001) as Geoff Webb
- McLeod's Daughters (season 1) (2001-02) as Brian Cronin
- Two Twisted (2006) as Mr Rogers
- All Saints (season 12, 2 episodes) (2009) as Russell Jaeger

== Stage ==
- Byzantine Flowers (1990)
- Gunjies - Travelling in Haunted Country (1993)
