= Jonah (Romeril musical) =

- Music: Alan John
- Lyrics: John Romeril
- Book: John Romeril
- Basis: Louis Stone's novel Jonah
- Productions: 1985 Sydney; 1991 Adelaide

Jonah (originally titled Jonah Jones) is an Australian musical with book and lyrics by John Romeril and music by Alan John. It is based on the 1911 novel Jonah by Australian writer Louis Stone. Set in the inner suburbs of Sydney in the thirty years prior to World War I, the musical is an ironic story of the capitalist rise of a hunchback shoe repairer from a leader of a local Push to an industrial magnate.

The musical was commissioned by the Sydney Theatre Company and first produced in 1985 after having been in development for six years.

== Productions ==
Jonah premiered (as Jonah Jones) at the Sydney Theatre Company's The Wharf Theatre on 26 October 1985, one of the first productions in the newly developed theatre. The cast included Simon Burke as Jonah Jones, Geraldine Turner as Mrs Yabsley, Lynne Emanuel as Ada Yabsley, Dianne Smith as Pink Partridge, Alan David Lee as Arthur 'Chook' Fowles, Wayne Scott Kermond as 'Waxy' Collins and Michelle Fawdon as Clara Grimes. Other cast members included Tony Taylor, Peter Carroll and Valerie Bader. The production was directed by Richard Wherrett with musical staging by Ross Coleman and musical direction by Michael Tyack. It was designed by Roger Kirk with lighting design by Nigel Levings and sound design by Colin Ford.

Sydney Theatre Company intended the season at the Wharf Theatre to be a tryout before a transfer to the larger Sydney Opera House Drama Theatre and a national tour. As it was not a popular success, this did not occur.

A revival by the State Theatre Company of South Australia was produced in Adelaide in 1991, at The Space, Adelaide Festival Centre. Neil Armfield directed the musical as a promenade production, with a cast including David Field and Nancye Hayes.

Jonah has also been performed a number of times at the Western Australian Academy of Performing Arts.

== Playscript and recordings ==
The book and lyrics were published by Currency Press in 2010 as part of a collection of John Romeril works.

Although there is no cast recording, the "Cardigan Street" musical sequence was performed by Nancye Hayes, Valerie Bader and Jodie Gillies in a 1994 ABC television special on Australian musicals (Once In a Blue Moon) and is featured on its soundtrack.
