= Alan John =

Australian composer (born 1958)

Alan John (born 7 May 1958 in Sydney) is an Australian composer. He studied music at the University of Sydney, graduating in 1980. His compositions include original music for various plays, films (such as Holding the Man, Three Dollars and The Bank) and TV series (including Love My Way), and the musicals Jonah Jones, Orlando Rourke and Snugglepot and Cuddlepie.

== Operas ==
His opera The Eighth Wonder was premiered in 1995 by Opera Australia. It was revived in 2000, during the Sydney Olympics Arts Festival, and again in 2016. In May 2008, his chamber opera Through the Looking Glass, to a libretto by Andrew Upton, was premiered by the Victorian Opera at the Malthouse Theatre, Melbourne, conducted by Richard Gill. In May 2011, his opera How to Kill your Husband (and other handy household hints), to a libretto by Timothy Daly and based on Kathy Lette's 2007 book of the same name, premiered at the same venue under the same conductor.

== Awards and nominations ==
=== APRA-AGSC Awards ===
The annual Screen Music Awards are presented by Australasian Performing Right Association (APRA) and Australian Guild of Screen Composers (AGSC) for television and film scores and soundtracks.

Year	Nominee / work	Award	Result
2004	Shark Net – John	Best Music for a Television Series or Serial	Won
2005	Three Dollars – John	Best Music for a Mini-Series or Telemovie	Nominated
2007	"Episode 7" – Dangerous – John, Steven Francis	Best Music for a Mini-Series or Telemovie	Nominated

=== Helpmann Awards ===
The Helpmann Awards are for live performance in Australia, including theatre, musicals, opera, dance and live music.

Year	Nominee / work	Award	Result
2007	Mother Courage and Her Children	Best Original Score	Nominated
2011	Diary of a Madman	Best Original Score	Won
2012	The White Guard	Best Original Score	Nominated
