= Red Beach (Santorini) =

Beach in Greece

Coordinates: 36°20′50″N 25°23′41″E

Red Beach is a volcanic sand beach on the Aegean island of Santorini. The beach is famed for its titular red-hued sand, (oxidised iron) and is a noted for being a popular tourist attraction.

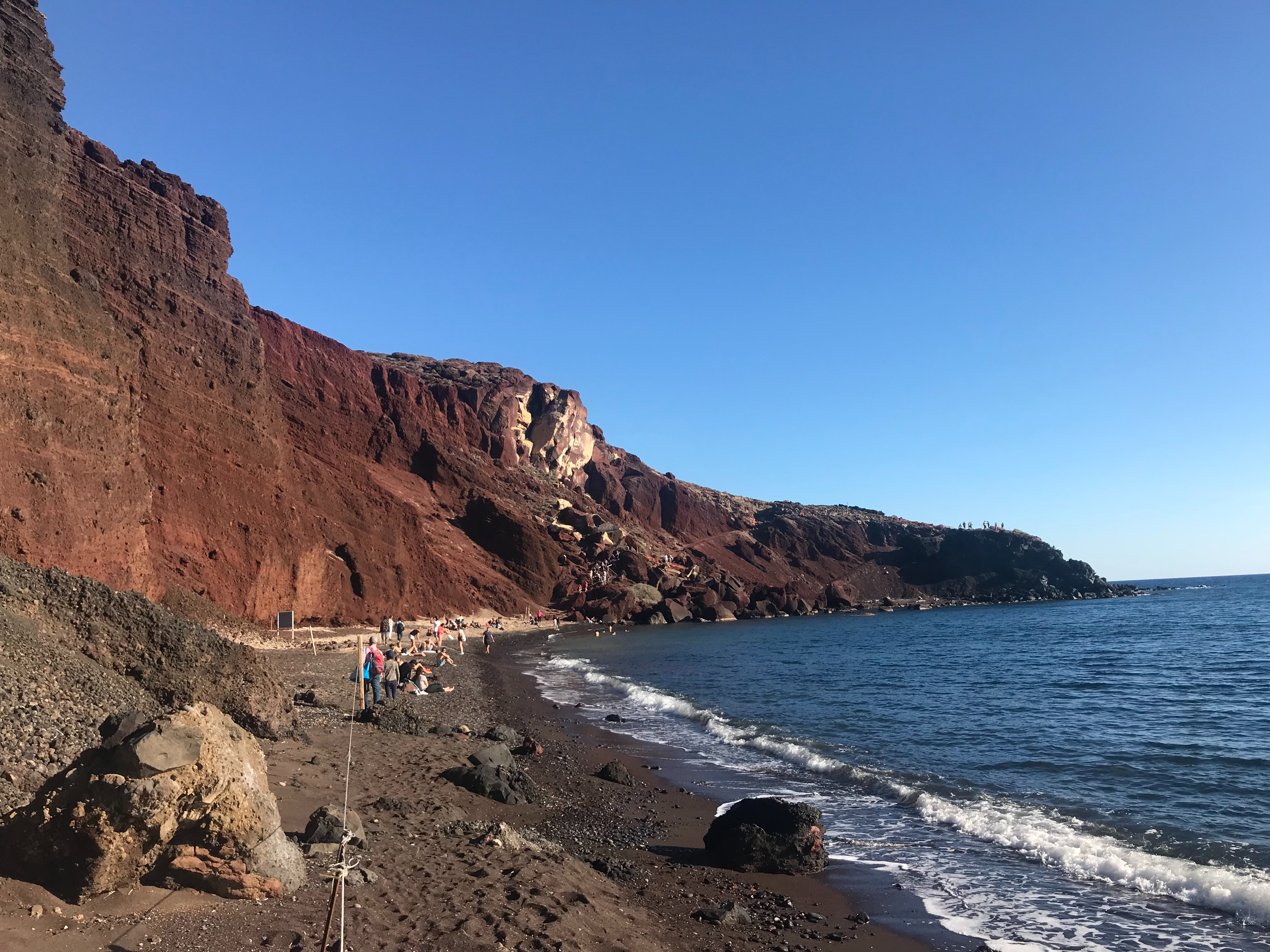
Red Beach from the west.

== Description ==
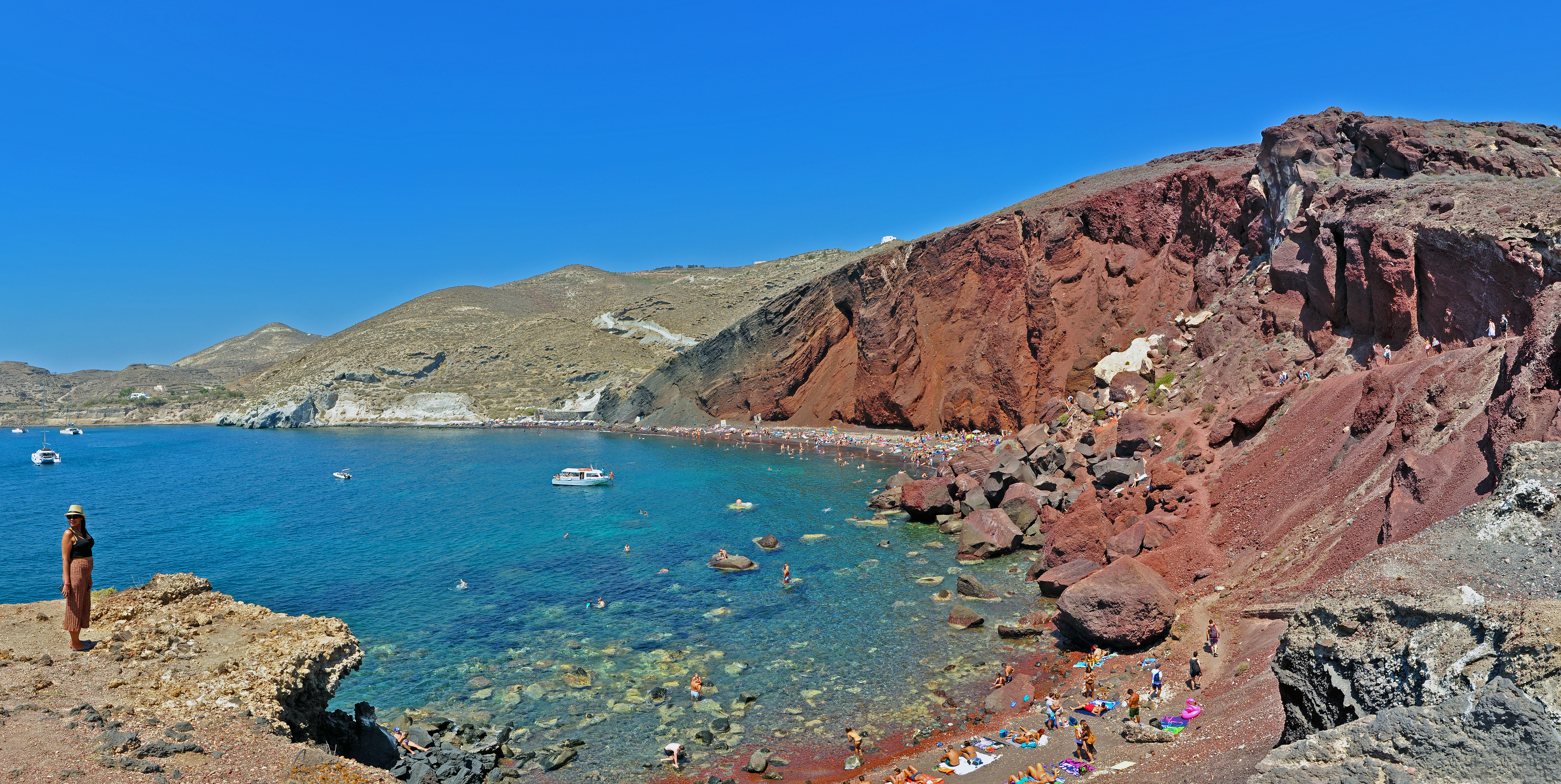
Panorama of the Red Beach

The beach's sand is composed of black and red pulverized volcanic rock from the nearby Santorini caldera. Red Beach can be accessed from nearby Akrotiri. The area is prone to landslides, and since 2013 parts of the beach have been inaccessible due to said slides.
