= Blesme =

- Commune
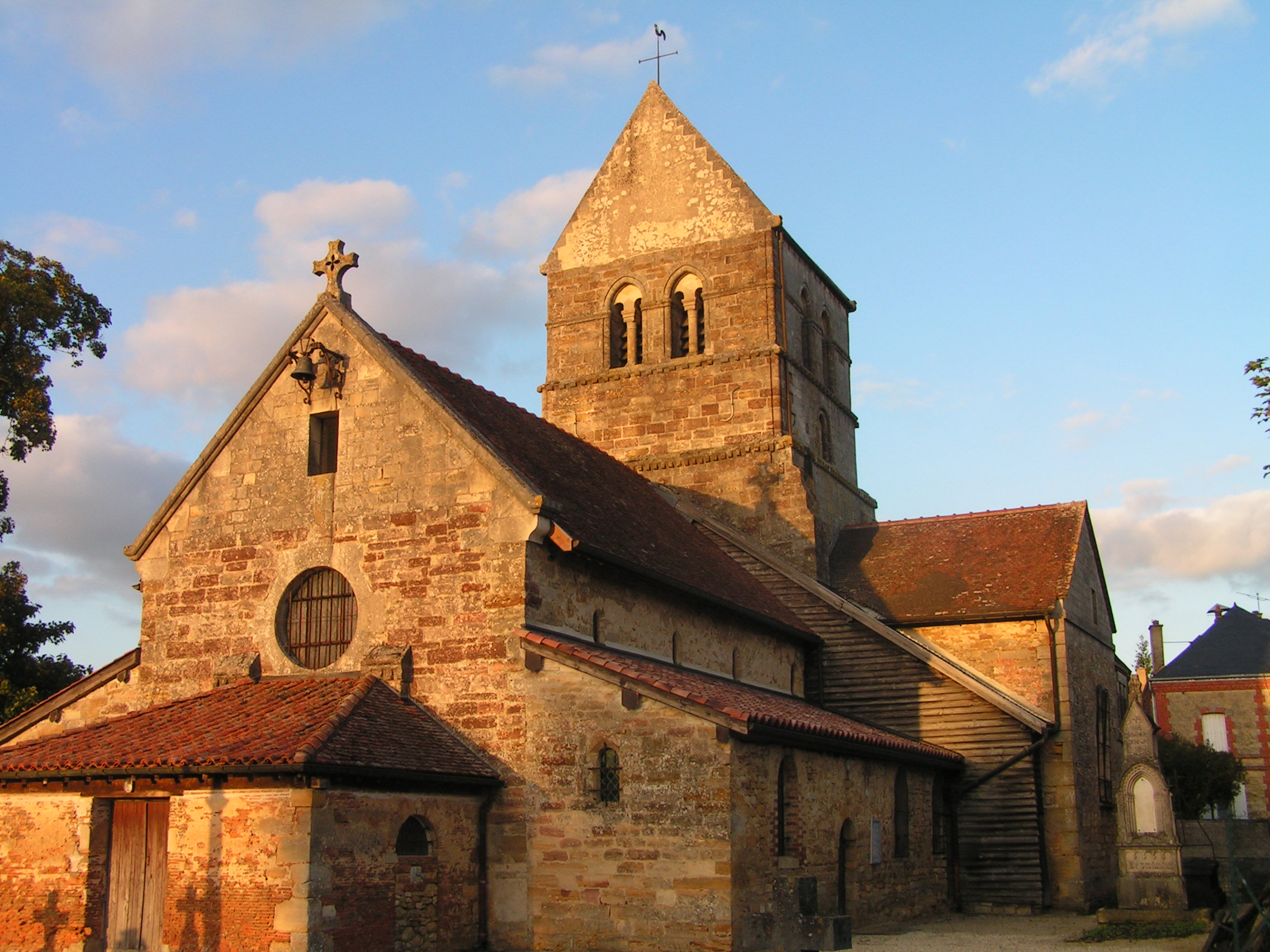
- The church in Blesme
- Location of Blesme
- Location within France Location within Grand Est
- Coordinates: 48°43′33″N 4°46′31″E
- Country: France
- Region: Grand Est
- Department: Marne
- Arrondissement: Vitry-le-François
- Canton: Sermaize-les-Bains

Government
  - Mayor (2020–2026): Franck Greslon
- Area^{1}: 6.7 km^{2} (2.6 sq mi)
- Elevation: 119 m (390 ft)
- Highest elevation: 137 m (449 ft)
- Lowest elevation: 111 m (364 ft)
- Population (2023): 193
  - Density: 29/km^{2} (75/sq mi)
- Time zone: UTC+01:00 (CET)
  - Summer (DST): UTC+02:00 (CEST)
- INSEE/Postal code: 51068 /51340
- ^{1} French Land Register data, which excludes lakes, ponds, glaciers > 1 km^{2} (0.386 sq mi or 247 acres) and river estuaries.

Blesme (French pronunciation: [blɛm]) is a commune of the Marne department in northeastern France.

== Population ==
Historical population
Year	Pop.	±% p.a.
1968	249	—
1975	200	−3.08%
1982	195	−0.36%
1990	192	−0.19%
1999	171	−1.28%
2007	178	+0.50%
2012	205	+2.86%
2017	214	+0.86%
2023	193	−1.71%
Source: INSEE

== See also ==
- Communes of the Marne department
