= Great Bookie robbery =

Robbery case in Melbourne Australia

The Great Bookie robbery was a heist committed in Melbourne, Australia, on 21 April 1976.

== Crime ==
A well-organized gang of six stole an estimated $14–16million (roughly $115,276,243 AUD in 2025) from bookmakers in the Victoria Club, located on the second floor of a building in Queen Street, Melbourne. The true figure for the amount stolen has never been confirmed, as the Victoria Club reported the missing figure to police as only $1 million to avoid the attention of the Australian Taxation Office. The gang rented an office several floors above, hiding the money in that room's safe before walking out of the building and onto the street–days after the event.

== Perpetrators ==
The gang included:

- Raymond "Chuck" Bennett (died 12 November 1979, shot to death), who is believed to have been the mastermind
- Ian Revell "Fingers" Carroll (Born 26 Aug 1947 - shot to death 3 January 1983)
- Laurence "Laurie" Prendergast (Missing from 23rd August 1985, declared dead by foul play at an inquest on 17 December 2021)
- Norman Leung "Chops" Lee (died on 28 July 1992, shot by police while attempting to rob the Ansett Air Freight terminal at Melbourne Airport)

== Aftermath ==
The identity of the robbers was widely known in the underworld and so Bennett became the target of standover men, including Brian and Leslie Kane, and corrupt police demanding part of the proceeds. The Kane brothers were particularly violent psychopaths who wanted 'their cut' and were willing to torture, mutilate and kill to get their own way. After being told that the Kanes intended to kill him, Bennett, Prendergast and Vincent Mikkelsen killed Leslie Kane on 19 October 1978 and went into hiding. The three were later arrested for the murder, but as the body was never found, the charges were dismissed. With Brian Kane threatening to kill him, Bennett was arrested on a minor charge in 1979. While being escorted by police from the courthouse holding cells to the courtroom, he was taken up a flight of stairs into the path of a man, disguised as a barrister. The man shot Bennett several times in the chest. Bennett tried to flee but collapsed on the courthouse steps and died a short time later. Although Brian Kane was suspected, circumstantial evidence suggested a conspiracy to kill Bennett, which included senior members of the Victorian Police, most notably Brian Murphy with whom Bennett had a long-standing feud.

No one has ever been arrested for Bennett's murder, which was effectively an execution.

When police searched through Ian Carroll's records after he was killed, they found that between April and June 1977, he deposited $437,165 in his accounts.

The stolen money was never recovered. Although Norman Lee was charged, he was later acquitted; none of the other members of the gang were ever convicted. Prendergast disappeared in 1985. Apart from Lee, all members of the gang had been murdered by the end of 1987. On 28 July, 1992, Lee was killed by police during a heist at Melbourne Airport. Lee's lawyer, Phillip Dunn, QC, later revealed the details of the crime, including the identities of all those involved. As no one was ever jailed or convicted, the Great Bookie robbery remains an unsolved crime.

== In popular culture ==
Robbery is a 1985 Australian television film directed by Michael Thornhill, which is based on the original crime but otherwise entirely fictional.

In 1986, a miniseries titled The Great Bookie Robbery, of three 90-minute episodes, was released depicting the robbery. This miniseries started filming on 26 August 1984, and was broadcast in September 1986. Lee participated in the production as a consultant, and even used his own residence in Verity Street, Richmond as the shooting location for the house of one of the gang. Lee was still living there at the time of his death.

The 2002 Australian feature film The Hard Word draws on the Great Bookie robbery for its major crime scene. In this version, however, a number of people are killed during the robbery.

A highly fictionalized version of the crime was also depicted in one episode of the 2009 miniseries Underbelly: A Tale of Two Cities. In this version, Bennett pulls off the crime with the assistance of Robert Trimbole, without the Kane brothers. The Kanes are tipped off after the event by Chris Flannery, setting off a turf war. Neither Trimbole nor Flannery was involved in the real heist.
