= Fættenfjorden =

Fjord in Trøndelag, Norway

- View of the Tirpitz in Fættenfjorden 1942, with Langstein in the background
- Interactive map of the fjord
- Location: Trøndelag county, Norway
- Coordinates: 63°33′36″N 10°55′24″E
- Type: Fjord
- Primary outflows: Trondheimsfjord
- Basin countries: Norway
- Max. length: 2 kilometres (1.2 mi)

Fættenfjorden is a small fjord that branches off of the Trondheimsfjord northeast of the city of Trondheim in Trøndelag county, Norway. The fjord is located on the border of Stjørdal Municipality and Levanger Municipality. The European route E06 highway runs along the southern shore of the 2-kilometre (1.2 mi) long fjord.

== History ==
The German battleship Tirpitz was moored here from 16 January 1942 to 29 October 1943. During this time the Royal Air Force attacked the Tirpitz four times with limited success. Due to the heavy amount of anti-aircraft weaponry, both on the ship and in the surrounding area, the RAF lost 17 airplanes and 64 crew members in the attempts.

== See also ==
- List of Norwegian fjords
