= Louis Stone =

Australian novelist and playwright (1871–1935)

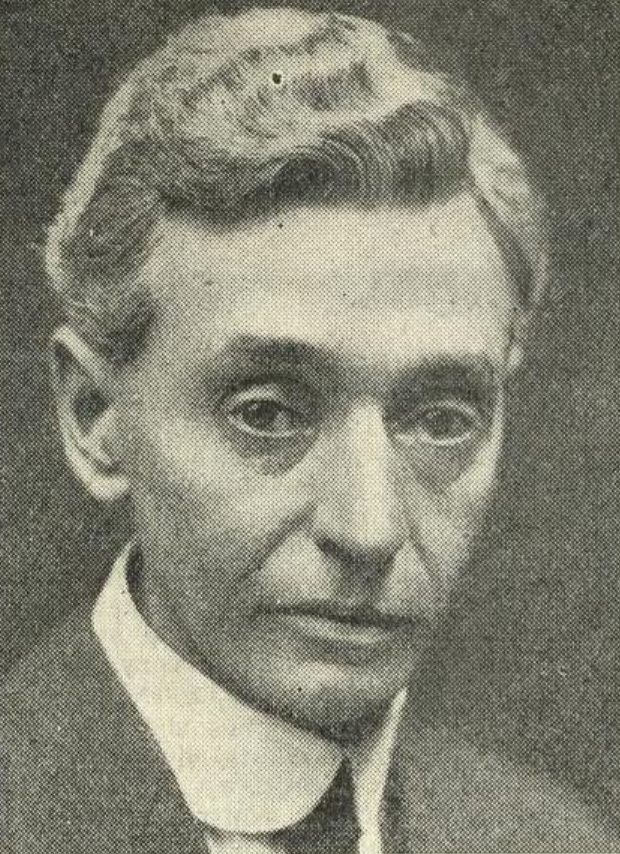
- Born: William Lewis; 21 October 1871; Leicester, England
- Died: 23 September 1935 (aged 63); Randwick, New South Wales, Australia
- Occupations: novelist and playwright
- Writing career
- Language: English
- Years active: 1911-1930

Louis Stone (21 October 1871 – 23 September 1935) was an Australian novelist and playwright.

== Early life ==
Stone was born in Leicester, England, baptized as William Lewis, son of William Stone, a basketmaker, and his wife Emma, née Tewkes. In 1884 the family emigrated to Brisbane, and then a year later, to Redfern in Sydney.

He grew up in poverty. His father, who was a marine, was largely absent.

Stone qualified as a primary school teacher in 1895 and had temporary teaching positions until he obtained a regular teaching job at Cootamundra. In 1901 Stone was transferred to South Wagga Wagga where he met Thomas Blamey who was influenced by Stone.

== Writing career ==
Around 1908 Stone married Abigail Allen and also began to write a novel Jonah, published in London in 1911.

According to Geoffrey Dutton, Stone was intimately familiar with the setting for Jonah, spending time in Waterloo and Paddy's Market, studying the local larrikins and their speech. The novel was warmly accepted by H. G. Wells, Galsworthy and George Bernard Shaw. It was not a financial success, until popularity was finally attained in the nineteen sixties and seventies after it was put on high school reading lists.

Caricature by David Low

H. M. Green, in his History of Australian literature, Vol.I (1984), described Stone as, "The most outstanding of the novelists of city life and one of the most outstanding of all the period's novelists." Green regards the most striking character in Jonah not the protagonist, Jonah Jones, but Mrs Yabsley, the enormous, illiterate old washerwoman, whom he describes as, "one of the most real and memorable characters in Australian literature."

In 1933, Jonah was republished by Percy Stephensen; it was also published in the United States as Larrikin. Jonah was adapted for a television series by the Australian Broadcasting Commission in 1982; it also provided the basis for the Sydney Theatre Company musical, Jonah Jones, in 1985.

Stone's second novel Betty Wayside was published in 1915.

He took six of his plays to London after World War I in the hope of having some of them staged, but without success. The only one to be staged in his lifetime was The Lap of the Gods which, produced by Gregan McMahon, had a one-week run in Sydney.

== Assessment ==
A character sketch of Louis Stone is given by Norman Lindsay in Bohemians of the Bulletin. Lindsay describes how the plot of Stone's last novel, Betty Wayside, was bowdlerized and thus fell into obscurity, leaving Stone with a sense of failure and a mental breakdown.

John Galsworthy in 1921 wrote, “I was much struck not long ago with Lewis Stone’s novel JONAH, a very fine piece of work. His second novel, too, is good. You have in him a writer whose full value Australia does not yet seem to have realised …”

== Bibliography ==
=== Novels ===
- Jonah (1911)
- Betty Wayside (1915)

=== Drama ===
- The Lap of the Gods (1923)
