= Manouchehr Farid =

Iranian actor (1938–2026)

Manouchehr Farid

Manouchehr Farid (Persian: منوچهر فرید; 27 February 1938 – 3 July 2026) was an Iranian-Australian actor. Living in Australia from 1985, Farid was especially known for featuring in plays and films of Iranian New Wave directors, and was a frequent collaborator with film director Bahram Beyzai, starring in his acclaimed 1972 film Downpour.

== Early life and education ==
Manouchehr Farid was born in Iran on 27 February 1938. He was of the Baháʼí Faith.

== Career ==
Farid performed in the theatre as well as on the big screen.

He starred in several plays and films of Iranian New Wave directors from 1966 to 1976. He was a regular collaborator with Bahram Beyzaie, starring in his films Downpour (1972), Ballad of Tara (Tcherike-ye Tara; 1979), and Stranger and the Fog (Gharibeh Va Meh; 1976). Downpour is included in The Film Foundation's World Cinema Project.

Farid also starred in Ebrahim Golestan's 1964 film Brick and Mirror (Khesht o Ayeneh); Masoud Kimiai's Baluch; and My Heritage, Insanity (Miras-e man, jonoon; 1981), directed by Mehdi Fakhimzadeh.

Farid and his family were forced to flee persecution for their faith when the Islamic Revolution swept across Iran in 1979. They first moved to California, and in 1985 emigrated to Australia, settling in Melbourne, Victoria.

== Life in Australia ==
In Australia, Farid worked in a textile factory for 35 years, and did not return to stage or film.

=== Simorgh ===
Young Iranian-Australian filmmaker Noora Niasari met him when she was in her final year of film studies at the Victorian College of the Arts (VCA). She got to know him over a period of months, and persuaded him to star in her short film Simorgh (The Phoenix). The film screened at many Australian and international film festivals in 2015, the 4th Persian Film Festival Australia, and the fourth Nepal Human Rights International Film Festival, among others. It won the Cinema Nova and New Voices Awards in the 46th Annual Graduate Film School Awards at the VCA, and was nominated in the 2015 Australian Director's Guild Awards in the "Best Direction in a Student Film" category. In the film, described as "a drama that blurs the line between fiction and documentary", Farid teaches drama to teenagers inside an Australian detention centre. The film is available via the VCA Film & Television archive. Niasari has said that the film reflects on loss of identity, sadness and nostalgia for the past.

== Personal life and death ==
Farid's son, Amir Farid, is a pianist who plays in a musical trio called the Benaud Trio.

Farid died on 3 July 2026, at the age of 88.
