= Scarygirl =

Scarygirl may refer to:

- Scarygirl (video game), a 2012 platformer video game based on an eponymous graphic novel
- Scarygirl (film), a 2023 film based on the graphic novel
