= Noora Niasari =

Iranian-Australian filmmaker

- Born: 1989 (age 35–36)
- Occupation: Filmmaker
- Years active: 2011–
- Notable work: Shayda (2023)

Noora Niasari (Persian نورا نیاسری; born 1989), sometimes formerly spelt Nora Niasari, is an Iranian-Australian film director based in Melbourne. She has made many short documentary and narrative films, and is best known for her debut feature film, Shayda, released in 2023. She is a co-founder of Parandeh Pictures.

== Early life and education ==
Noora Niasari was born in Tehran, Iran, in 1989. Her family emigrated to Brisbane when she was young and she was raised in Australia. One of Niasari's earliest memories from her childhood was her time spent living in a women's shelter in Australia. Her mother left an abusive relationship and the persecution of the Islamic Republic to try and better her and her daughters' lives. Noora spent eight months there, aged five. Her mother introduced her to films by Iranian filmmakers such as Abbas Kiarostami's Where Is the Friend's House? and Jafar Panahi's The White Balloon when she was a child, which sparked an interest in cinema and informed her about life in Iran.

Niasari initially studied architecture at the University of Technology Sydney (UTS), graduating in 2010. While she was there, she attended a short film workshop in Wales, UK, run by professor, artist, and architect Richard Goodwin, during which she interviewed migrant residents of a council housing block in Cardiff. She has said that she is grateful for her architectural education, as it "informs so much of how I write, in terms of moving through space, how it influences us and creates a narrative structure".

Shortly after this she turned to filmmaking, starting with a series of documentary short films. In she 2014 completed a Masters in Film and Television (Narrative) from the Victorian College of the Arts (Melbourne University).

== Career ==
In 2011, Niasari made a short documentary in Beirut, Lebanon, called Beirut, Under the Bridge, or just Under the Bridge. The film looks how Beirut's public transport terminals had changed between the 1975 Lebanese Civil War and the present. The film was screened at the Beirut International Film Festival (BIFF). Niasari's first name is listed as "Nora" in the credits of this film and others.

In 2013, she made a short narrative film, 17 Years and a Day, which also screened in the ME Shorts section of BIFF.

In 2014, as a student at the VCA, Niasari made the short film Simorgh (The Phoenix), has as its subject Manouchehr Farid, a well-known actor in Iran who featured in films directed by Bahram Beyzai such as the 1972 film Downpour. This was his first screen appearance in 35 years. In the film, Farid teaches drama to teenagers inside an Australian detention centre. The film screened at many Australian and international film festivals in 2015, including the 64th Melbourne International Film Festival (in the Accelerator program for emerging directors), the 14th Dhaka International Film Festival, the 4th Persian Film Festival Australia, and the fourth Nepal Human Rights International Film Festival, among others. It won the Cinema Nova and New Voices Awards in the 46th Annual Graduate Film School Awards at the VCA, and was nominated in the 2015 Australian Director's Guild Awards in the "Best Direction in a Student Film" category. The film is available via the VCA Film & Television archive.

Niasari's mother had introduced her to Iranian filmmaker Abbas Kiarostami's films when she was a child, which sparked an interest in cinema. Years later, in 2015, she studied under Kiarostami in a filmmaking workshop in Barcelona, Spain. Kiarostami encouraged her to explore hre relationship with her father, which she had not done before.

Casa Antúnez (Antúnez House; 2017) was Niasari's first long-form (Note: 53 minutes) documentary film as writer and director. It was selected for screening in the 2017 Sheffield DocFest, where she earned a nomination for the New Talent Award. Also in 2017, her narrative short Waterfall, funded by Screen Australia's Hot Shots Program and produced by Fete Films, screened at the 7th edition of the Persian Film Festival Australia, which is presented in cinemas across Australia.

Niasari's debut feature film Shayda (2023), which she wrote and directed, stars Iranian-French actress Zar Amir Ebrahimi, along with Australian actors Leah Purcell and Osamah Sami (who had been a friend for 10 years) in supporting roles, and most of the dialogue is in Farsi. The story is based on Niasari's memories of living at the women's shelter as a child, and features Persian cultures and traditions, including Nowruz (Persian New Year), with its theme of renewal and rebirth. The film was executive produced by Cate Blanchett under her Dirty Films company. It had its world premiere at the 2023 Sundance Film Festival, where it won the Audience Award in the World Dramatic Competition. It was also selected as Australia's official submission for Best International Feature Film at the 96th Academy Awards.

Niasari has been working on a second narrative feature, Raya. The film is based on a book of the same name by Mahsa Rahmani Noble, a work of historical fiction about Soraya Esfandiary-Bakhtiary, the second wife of Shah Mohammad Reza Pahlavi, Queen of Iran from 1951 to 1958.

As of September 2025 she is based in Castlemaine, Victoria.

== Parandeh Pictures ==
Niasari is co-founder of Parandeh Pictures, which co-produced Shayda. She founded the company in order "to champion cross-cultural and regional narratives".

== Recognition and accolades ==
Blanchett said in an interview about Shayda in 2023: "Vincent and Noora had been developing Shayda for some time and they brought it to us toward the end of the development process to help secure financing and key cast members... We knew this story was strong and had perspective unlike any Australian film we had seen before. It's an intensely personal and domestic scenario but the story Noora drew out of it, we felt had wider cultural resonances. Noora's short films [17 Years and a Day, Tâm] proved she was a visceral filmmaker with an emotionally rich point of view".

Niasari has earned many awards and nominations, including:

- 2011: Special Jury Prize and Best Director Documentary Awards at the 11th Beirut International Film Festival, both for Beirut, Under the Bridge
- 2014: Winner, WorldFest Houston's Gold Remi Award for 17 Years and a Day
- 2014: Winner, Cinema Nova and New Voices Awards in the 46th Annual Graduate Film School Awards at the VCA for Simorgh (The Phoenix)
- 2015: Nominated, Australian Director's Guild Awards in the "Best Direction in a Student Film" category for Simorgh (The Phoenix)
- 2017: Nominated, New Talent Award at the Sheffield DocFest, for Antúnez House
- 2023: Listed by IndieWire as one of "28 Rising Female Filmmakers to Watch in 2023"
- 2023: Winner, Sundance Film Festival Audience Award for Shayda
- 2023: Winner, Australian Directors' Guild Awards, Best Direction in a Feature Film (Budget $1m or over)
- 2023: Nominated, Directors Guild of America Award, Outstanding Directing – First-Time Feature Film for Shayda
- 2023: Winner, CinefestOZ Film Prize for Shayda, worth $100,000
- 2024: Winner, Film Critics Circle of Australia Award (FCCA) for best screenplay for Shayda
- 2024: Shayda submitted as Australia's official entry for Best International Feature Film at the 96th Academy Awards
- 2024: Alumni Award from UTS
