= Nathan Jurevicius =

Canadian-Australian toy designer, author and artist (born 1973)

Nathan Jurevicius (born 1973) is a Canadian/Australian illustrator, director, toy designer, author, and fine artist whose diverse range of work has appeared in numerous publications, advertising campaigns, festivals, and galleries around the world. He is best known for Scarygirl, which started in 2001 with a vinyl toy range and has since developed into graphics novels, online games, a VR Free Roam experience, and an animated feature film.

== Scarygirl ==
Appearing in comics, vinyl toys, games, and internationally exhibited artwork, Scarygirl is about a misshapen orphan searching for the truth about her past. The cute but slightly odd little girl was abandoned late one night and later found and brought up by a friendly octopus called Blister and guided by a mystic rabbit called Bunniguru. The series has since expanded into other mediums, such as an online comic, video games, graphic novels, limited edition vinyl toys, and travelling shows.

=== Toy Series ===
Initially created as on online concept, Nathan's plans for Scarygirl changed direction when acclaimed Hong Kong based toy-manufacturing company Flying Cat contacted him to create a set of limited edition toys. The creations were focused around large vinyl figures, including the Octocity Scarygirl, Treedweller, Dr Maybee, Chihoohoo and more, and have been called one of the defining toy lines of the mid-2000s. In 2016, Scarygirl was a recipient of the Hall of Fame Award at the Designer Toy Awards.

The Scarygirl world was then expanded further with two mini-series of figures created by Kidrobot – City Folk in 2007 and Swamp Folk in 2009 – and then a limited edition Blister the Octopus 8” vinyl art toy in 2018, which was produced by Gums Production in Hong Kong with exclusive colour-ways released by Kidrobot and Toy Tokyo.

=== Graphic novels ===
In 2008 Nathan completed his first graphic novel based on Scarygirl. The two-part, textless graphic novel traces the small heroine's adventures from the moment she is mysteriously dumped at a remote beach. Together with two newfound friends – gentle Blister, a super-intelligent giant octopus, and philosophical rabbit Bunniguru – Scarygirl sets off towards the huge city to uncover some secrets about her past and about the strange man who haunts her dreams.

The hardback graphic novel was released by Australia's leading Independent publisher, Allen and Unwin, and distributed in North America by Last Gasp and ARX in Brazil. The graphic novel has since garnered various accolades including winning the 2009 Aurealis Award for Best Illustrated Book/Graphic Novel, the 2010 CBCA Notable Picture Book list and included in International Youth Library's The White Ravens 2010, an annual selection of outstanding books for children and young adults.

Scarygirl was also part of the Silent Comics event at the 2011 GRAPHIC festival at the Sydney Opera House. The event paired the visuals of well-known wordless comics and graphic novels - such as those of Peter Kuper and Robert Crumb - with live performances by bands such as Gotye and Plaid. Scarygirl was paired with Australian band Seekae.

In early 2012 Nathan completed the novel's sequel 'The Adventures of Scarygirl', which expanded on the original book and completed its cliffhanger ending. It featured additional 80 pages as well as sketches from Dr Maybee's journal.

=== Video games ===
Working with Passion Pictures Australia, in 2009 Scarygirl was adapted into online game. The number of players has surpassed 1 million and has been hailed as " one of the most beautiful and unusual flash games on the web..." The game has been awarded IGN's 'Indie Pick of the Week', the Communication Arts Award of Excellence, and FWA's Site of the Day, was nominated for Best Browser Game at The Escapist Awards, was a finalist for an AFI for Screen Content Innovation, and made the cover of May 2009's STASH DVD magazine.

Following on from its success, TikGames approached Nathan to develop an adaptation of the Flash game. Scarygirl the console game was released by Square Enix for Xbox Live (18 January 2012), PlayStation Network (24 January 2012) and Windows PC (May 2012).

Nathan's production design was praised by Conrad Zimmerman of Destructoid as “a delightful contradiction of cute and creepy and comes to life in the environment and character designs”, with Peter Eykemans from IGN commenting that “stylish visuals paint imaginative characters and a diverse world of mountaintops, cities, oceans, and caves in a 2.5D style… the overall aesthetics are beautiful… ScaryGirl elicits a nostalgic kind of triumph.”

=== VR Free Roam Experience ===
In 2019, Nathan became the Creative Director of Dark Slope, a Toronto-based virtual and augmented reality (VR and AR) developer. Their first project was Scarygirl: Mission Maybee, a first-person action game that brings up to eight players together to save the world from Dr Maybee and his diabolical experiments.

Scarygirl Mission Maybee was released worldwide by Zero Latency in 33 locations across 18 countries including Canada, Australia, Spain, France, Japan, and the United States. Scarygirl Mission Maybee was also licensed to Disneyland Shanghai via SoReal.

=== Feature Film ===
A film based on Scarygirl was released theatrically in 2023. It starred Jillian Nguyen and Tim Minchin and was directed by Ricard Cusso, with Sophie Byrne producing the film and John Stevenson acting as executive producer. Jurevicius was involved with the film as a production designer.

== Toy Series ==
=== Owl Ranges ===
Part of the first wave of Western vinyl toy designers, Nathan has created over 150 different characters, which often reference owls as their symbology is important in his Lithuanian heritage.

His various owl series include the wind-up Peleda range from Toy Tokyo, which was sold in Urban Outfitters, and his collaborations with Kidrobot, which include the Misko wooden series, the mini-figure Night Rider series, and the Dievas Dunny. Nathan also worked with IKEA to create the limited edition Swedish-produced glass sculpture, Sutemos, which translates to Nightfall in Lithuanian and was sold in IKEA stores worldwide.

=== Mini Treehouse ===
Nathan also created the Scarygirl spin-off toy concept 'Mini Treehouse', produced by Strange Co and Flying Cat. Solo exhibitions of the toys and artwork have travelled the globe with multiple appearances in Canada, Australia, Taiwan, USA, and Japan.

The brand was adapted and renamed 'Dudson' for a series of 90 x 15 second teaser animated clips for the Toronto subways (a first for Canada), which were created in conjunction with Wild Brain (previously Decode and DHX Media).

=== MTV Collaborations ===
In 2007 Nathan Jurevicius was approached by MTV Canada to collaborate and create characters for their Summer 06 and Winter 07 campaigns, which were directed by filmmaker Anthony Scott Burns. Besides the Canadian cable market, the advertisements appeared on the giant MTV HD screen in Times Square and were also picked up in Poland and the U.K. The campaign won several awards at the 2008 Promax/BDA Advertising Awards including the Judges Choice Award for Art Direction & Design.

Nathan's Fauna characters pulled in so many calls and emails to MTV Canada that the in-house creative team decided to repackage them as mobile wallpapers and create an online home for them.

Building on the excitement further, five of the Fauna characters were released as a range of limited edition sculptures, each with their own extensive story to complement the detailed designs and bold colors.

One of the Fauna figures was adapted became a special prize at the MTV Latin America Awards. Part of the MTV Agents of Change initiative, the Chiuku award recognizes celebrities’ work who use their influence to contribute and develop social projects.

== Peleda ==
In mid 2013 Nathan co-wrote and co-directed 'Peleda' with his brother Luke Jurevicius for the Australian Broadcasting Corporation. This action/adventure story based on Lithuanian mythology featured an immersive 3D online game and a short animated film that explains the mysteries of 'Peleda's' past.

Peleda launched in late September 2013 and has since won an Australian Academy Award (AACTA) for Best Production Design in Television, two New York Kidscreen Awards including one for Best One-Off Television Special, and in 2015 was awarded China's Sichuan TV Gold Panda statue for Most Innovative Children Web-Based Animation.

A 26-episode television series of the property, entitled Owl Riders, is currently in development at Vishus Productions, with co-producers Cheeky Little Media.

== Junction ==
In 2015 Nathan's began working on his next project, Junction, a graphic novel inspired by the parental tall tale of warning “if the wind changes your face will stick like that,” as well as Judeo-Christian mythology and Baltic fairytales. Junction was published in 2015 by Koyama Press.

Junction was adapted into a short animated film, which he wrote and directed. Junction was made with the assistance of the Lithuanian Film Centre, and was praised as “memorable and full of enchantment, the film is a visual treat and heart-warming story”.

Debuting at the TIFF Kids in 2016, the film has toured in over 120 festival across the world including being the Official Opening Film at the Melbourne International Animation Festival, and has won multiple awards, including the Audience Award at the Vilnius International Film Festival “Kino Pavasaris”, and Winner Best Animated Film at the Cayman Islands International Film Festival.

== Artwork and Lectures ==
In addition to his toy creations, graphic novels, character designs, and film projects, Nathan is an artist and illustrator, often working in pencil, watercolours, or ink. His style draws on his Baltic heritage and creates words from the mundane, Nathan's artworks are collected by with art and pop culture collectors alike and have been exhibited in shows around the globe including Italy, Japan, Taiwan, the Philippines, Australia, Germany and the United States.

With works based on everything from edamame beans, to broken pencil leads, to Lithuanian desserts, Nathan has recently been creating a series of art based on an eclectic selection of cult musical performers from the 1950s to current day, which have been featured in exhibitions at galleries such as Outre Gallery in Melbourne and Wootbear Gallery in San Francisco.

Since 2016, Nathan has been a character design tutor of the Pictoplasma Academy Masterclass in Berlin. Along with Rilla Alexander, Nathan guides participants on refining their own projects and ideas with a focus on clear technical skill in the creation of character driven visuals.

He also has an online course on Illustrated Character Design and World Creation on Domestika, where anyone can learn how to create original characters and envision the environment they inhabit, through ideation and practical exercises that can be applied to various media.

Other organizations Nathan has guest lectured for include the Vilnius Academy of Art, Blue Sky Studios, TBWA Toronto, Inspiration Festival Argentina, AGIDEAS International design festival, Ontario College of Art and Design, Australian Centre for the Moving Image (ACMI) and the Sydney Opera House.

Nathan Jurevicius has worked as a freelance illustrator and artist for many international companies and publications. His clients have included Nickelodeon, Scholastic Inc, The Financial Review, Zinkia Entertainment, Subaru, Comedy Central, Allen and Unwin, Fuji, MTV, The Wall Street Journal, ABC, Warner Bros, and designed the Australian mascot (Kamone) for the World Expo in Aichi, Japan.

== Filmography ==
Year	Title	Role	Notes
2023	Scarygirl	Creator/Production Designer/Lead Character Designer	Feature Film
2018	Blue Cherry	Writer/Director/Art Director	Short Film
2016	Junction	Writer/Director/Production Designer/Illustrator	Short Film
2015	Ziptronik Megablast	Writer/Director/Illustrator	TV movie
2012	Peleda	Co-Writer/Co-director/Production Designer	TV series
2007	Spear	Co-director/Art Director	Short Film
2003	Orpheus and The Underworld	Writer/Director/Art Director	Short Film
