= Luke Jurevicius =

Australian director, producer & composer

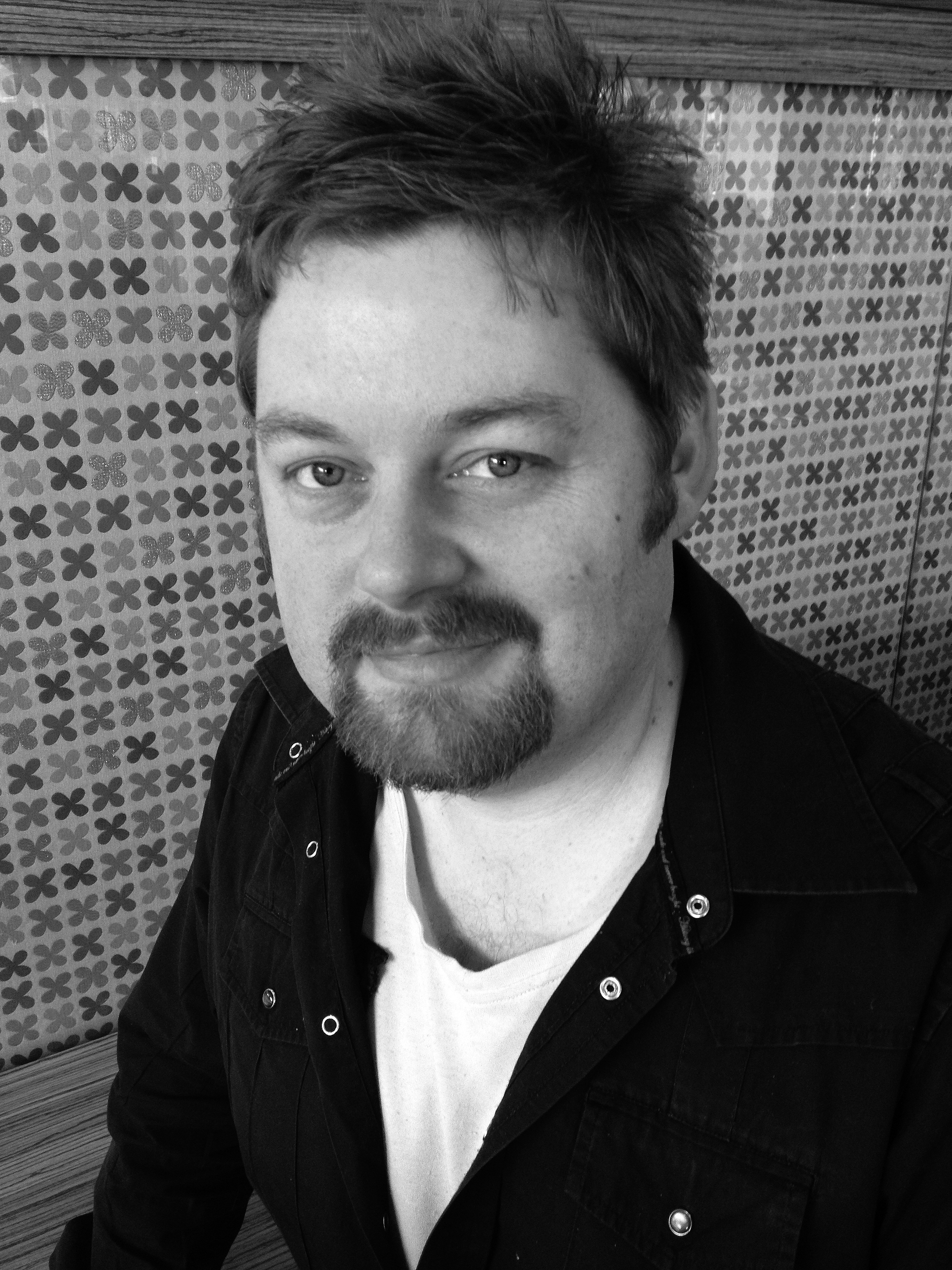
Luke Jurevicius

Luke Jurevicius is a director, producer, composer and voice actor from Adelaide, South Australia, who is best known for his TV series The Adventures of Figaro Pho. He frequently collaborates with his brother, artist Nathan Jurevicius.

== Career ==
Jurevicius' first major breakthrough into independent animated filmmaking was the ABC cross-platform initiative, Dust Echoes. He was the creative director and composer for 13 X 5-minute animated films based on the Indigenous stories of the Beswick community in the Northern Territory, Australia. He was awarded the AGSC/APRA award for Best Music for Children's Television.

As a content creator/director/producer Jurevicius has brought to life numerous projects including two seasons of the animated interstitial series Horace in Slow Motion and the music video for Australian band The Audreys' song "Sometimes the Stars".

== Figaro Pho series ==
Luke's major breakthrough as a content creator was the worldwide hit series Figaro Pho (26 X 90second interstitial series). The animated series garnered numerous awards, including two AFI and three Kidscreen Awards in New York City.

The success of Figaro Pho attracted producers Chocolate Liberation Front, giving birth to the longform animated series The New Adventures of Figaro Pho, which has been aired in over 100 countries. The series collected multiple awards including the AFI/AACTA Award for Best Children's Television Animation, two Kidscreen Awards for Best Animation and Best Design, two Asian Television Awards and the AEAF Award for Best Children's TV series.

Following the success of series one, Luke directed & co-produced The New Adventures of Figaro Pho with Oscar nominated VFX giants LUMA Pictures under their newly created Luma Toons banner. Luke received the APRA/AGSC Music award the second time for his music composition.

== Work with Nathan Jurevicius ==
Luke has a long-standing collaboration with fellow artist and brother, Nathan Jurevicius (Scarygirl) and together, they co-created, directed and produced PELEDA – a multi-platform animation set in a pseudo-Baltic wonderland. It wowed the Kidscreen Judges, winning two Kidscreen Awards in NYC. It also won the AACTA Award for Best Production Design and the Golden Panda Award in China for the Most Innovative Mature Audience Web-based Animation Award.

The duo paired up again to produce the short film Junction, based on Nathan's original graphic novel, with leading Lithuanian studio Okta Films. Junction was screened in over 50 festivals around the world and received the Vilnius International Film Festival "Kino Pavasaris" award for Audience choice, the internal Judges award at the Rincon International Film Festival and the Best Animation Short Movie award at the Cayman Islands International Film Festival.

Luke is director of the animated feature film Arkie, with producer Sophie Byrne (The Lost Thing), and based on Nathan's Scarygirl concept. In 2017 it was announced that Shailene Woodley and Jai Courtney would star in the film.

== Filmography ==
Year	Title	Role	Notes
2018	Larry the Wonderpug	Animation Director	TV series
2017	Sherazade: The Untold Stories	Co-Director / Creative Producer / Voice Director / Actor	TV series
2016	Junction	Consulting Director / Editor / Composer	Short
2015	The New Adventures of Figaro Pho	Producer / Director / Actor / Composer	TV series
2013	Peleda	Producer / Director / Composer	TV series and Online Game
2012	Horace in Slow Motion	Producer / Director / Designer / Composer	TV series
2012	The Adventures of Figaro Pho	Director / Actor / Producer / Composer	TV series
2010	Wadu Matyidi	Animation Director / Producer	Short
2009	Figaro Pho	Producer / Director / Composer	TV series
2007	Dust Echoes	Creative Producer / Director / Composer	Shorts
