= Fingernails (film) =

2023 film by Christos Nikou

- Release poster
- Directed by: Christos Nikou
- Written by: Christos Nikou; Sam Steiner; Stavros Raptis
- Produced by: Coco Francini; Andrew Upton; Cate Blanchett; Christos Nikou; Lucas Wiesendanger
- Starring: Jessie Buckley; Riz Ahmed; Jeremy Allen White; Luke Wilson
- Cinematography: Marcell Rév
- Edited by: Yorgos Zafeiris
- Music by: Christopher Stracey
- Production companies: FilmNation Entertainment; Dirty Films
- Distributed by: Apple TV+
- Release dates: August 31, 2023 (Telluride); October 27, 2023 (United States)
- Running time: 113 minutes
- Country: United States
- Language: English

Fingernails is a 2023 science fiction romantic drama film directed and co-written by Christos Nikou. The film stars Jessie Buckley, Riz Ahmed, Jeremy Allen White, and Luke Wilson. Cate Blanchett serves as one of the film's producers. The film follows a woman who starts working at an institute that tests whether the love between two people in a couple is real.

Fingernails premiered at the 50th Telluride Film Festival on August 31, 2023, and was released in limited theaters on October 27, 2023, prior to its streaming release on Apple TV+ on November 3, 2023.

== Plot ==
Some years before the film, a test using a fingernail from each person determining whether couples were truly in love was developed. However, the test has had mostly negative results, which leads to an increase in couples breaking up and divorcing.

Unemployed schoolteacher Anna gets a job as an instructor at the Love Institute, a one-year-old company founded by a man named Duncan, where researchers and instructors have couples undergo relationship-strengthening exercises to help them pass the test. Duncan believes that continued research will be beneficial, hoping for more positive test results. Anna initially keeps her hiring a secret from her boyfriend Ryan, with whom she has previously passed the test.

Anna shadows Amir, a fellow instructor, and develops a rapport with him as they guide clients through the exercises. Though Amir claims he and his girlfriend Natasha have also passed the test, his fondness for Anna is apparent. Meanwhile, Anna secretly does experiments and exercises with an oblivious Ryan to test their love. She eventually confesses about her job to Ryan, explaining that she feared that taking the job would strain their relationship, though it clearly does.

After Anna first performs the test on a promising client couple, she is shaken and disappointed when the result is negative, to which Amir tells her that she'll get used to it. At a workplace party, Amir's girlfriend Natasha is confused when Anna brings up his being gluten-intolerant, causing Anna to question if she and Amir have mutual feelings for each other.

Another day, Amir rips out his own fingernail to comfort a client nervous about the procedure. The client couple gets a positive result, delighting everyone. Seeing the opportunity, Anna secretly tests Amir's fingernail with her own. The result is 50%, meaning one person is more in love with the other. When she asks Duncan if a person can have a positive result with two different people, he rejects her hypothesis. She later convinces a hesitant Ryan to take the test with her again, and they pass.

The next day, Anna confesses her findings to Amir, who confirms his feelings for her when she speculates that he is in love with her but she doesn't love him. Later that night, Anna and Amir kiss and sleep together. She expresses hesitancy about continuing her relationship with Ryan, stating, "Sometimes, being in love is lonelier than being alone."

Amir admits that he started working at the Love Institute because he felt there was something wrong after never getting any positive test results. When Anna decides she wants to stay with him, Amir says they shouldn't be together and obey the test results, still confused by the situation. She stays over for the night, but she wakes up and decides to remove more of her fingernails in his kitchen out of heartbreak. Waking up and discovering this, Amir stops and comforts her. As they wait for her fingers to heal, they smile at each other.

== Cast ==
- Jessie Buckley as Anna, Ryan's girlfriend
- Riz Ahmed as Amir, Anna's co-worker and love-interest
- Jeremy Allen White as Ryan, Anna's boyfriend
- Luke Wilson as Duncan, Anna and Amir's boss
- Christian Meer as Rob
- Amanda Arcuri as Sally
- Annie Murphy as Natasha, Amir's girlfriend
- Katy Breier as Alexandra
- Clare McConnell as Carrie
- Nina Kiri as Liane
- Jim Watson as Andy
- Varun Saranga as Garth
- Juno Rinaldi as the principal

== Production ==
The film was announced in January 2021, with Carey Mulligan starring and Christos Nikou writing and directing, marking the Greek filmmaker's English-language debut. Mulligan joined the project upon watching and being impressed by Nikou's previous film Apples. No further developments would be announced until May 2022, when Jessie Buckley and Riz Ahmed were cast in the film, with Buckley replacing Mulligan. Apple Studios would also acquire the rights to the film that same month. In September, Jeremy Allen White joined the cast. Luke Wilson and Annie Murphy would be added to the cast in December.

Principal photography commenced in Toronto and Hamilton, Ontario in late October 2022 and wrapped that December.

== Release ==
Fingernails had its world premiere at the 50th Telluride Film Festival on August 31, 2023. It also screened at the 2023 Toronto International Film Festival on September 12, 2023. The movie had its European premiere during the Zurich Film Festival on September 29, 2023. It had a limited release on October 27, 2023, prior to streaming on Apple TV+ on November 3, 2023.

== Reception ==
=== Critical response ===
On the review aggregator website Rotten Tomatoes, 60% of 142 critics' reviews are positive, with an average rating of 5.9/10. The website's consensus reads: "A trio of solid performances help Fingernails get its thought-provoking ideas across in spite of an occasionally underwhelming story." Metacritic, which uses a weighted average, assigned the film a score of 63 out of 100, based on 30 critics, indicating "generally favorable" reviews.

=== Accolades ===
| Award | Date of ceremony | Category | Recipient(s) | Result | Ref. |
|---|---|---|---|---|---|
| San Sebastián International Film Festival | 30 September 2023 | Golden Shell | Fingernails | Nominated | |
| BFI London Film Festival | 15 October 2023 | Best Film | Fingernails | Nominated | |
| São Paulo International Film Festival | 1 November 2023 | New Directors Competition | Christos Nikou | Nominated | |
| Thessaloniki Film Festival | 12 November 2023 | International Competition | Fingernails | Nominated | |
| Thessaloniki Film Festival | 12 November 2023 | Human Values Award | Fingernails | Won | |
