= Dirty Films =

Film and television production company

- Type: Private
- Industry: Film industry
- Founded: 20 January 2000; 26 years ago
- Founder: Cate Blanchett; Andrew Upton
- Key people: Coco Francini
- Website: dirtyfilms.com

Dirty Films is an Australian independent film and television production company founded by married couple, Cate Blanchett and Andrew Upton. The company was incorporated in the United Kingdom on 20 January 2000. Films produced include Bangers (1999), Little Fish (2005), Carol (2015), Shayda (2023), The New Boy (2023), and Fingernails (2023). Television productions include the series Stateless (2020), and Mrs. America (2020).

== History ==
The company's first feature film, Little Fish, directed by Rowan Woods, was released in 2005. The romantic drama film Carol (2015), directed by Todd Haynes, was produced in association with Dirty Films, and received six Academy Awards nominations.

In June 2020, Dirty Films signed a first-look deal with New Republic Pictures. In July 2020, it signed a first look television deal with FX Productions, with Coco Francini joining the company as a partner.

In February 2022, it released its first podcast on Audible, Climate of Change with Cate Blanchett and Danny Kennedy, hosted by Blanchett and Kennedy.

In 2023, Dirty Films produced Shayda directed by Noora Niasari, The New Boy directed by Warwick Thornton, and Fingernails directed by Christos Nikou.

Upcoming projects include the television series Disclaimer for Apple TV+, directed by Alfonso Cuarón.

== Filmography ==
Films
Year	Title	Director	Production company	Distributor	Rotten Tomatoes
2005	Little Fish	Rowan Woods	Porchlight Films; Australian Film Finance Corporation; Mullis Capital Independent; Myriad Pictures	Icon Film Distribution	90%
2015	Truth	James Vanderbilt	Echo Lake Entertainment; Mythology Entertainment; RatPac-Dune Entertainment	Sony Pictures Classics	63%
2015	Carol	Todd Haynes	Number 9 Films; Film4; Killer Films	StudioCanal	94%
2021	Burning	Eva Orner	Amazon MGM Studios	Amazon Prime Video	94%
2022	Apples	Christos Nikou	Boo Productions; Lava Films; Perfo Production; Greek Film Centre; Polish Film Institute; ERT; MEDIA	Madman Entertainment	93%
2023	The New Boy	Warwick Thornton	Scarlett Pictures; Screen Australia; Fremantle Australia; Longbridge Nominees; South Australian Film Corporation; Screen NSW	Roadshow Films	72%
2023	Shayda	Noora Niasari	Origma 45; The 51 Fund; HanWay Films; Parandeh Pictures	Madman Entertainment	96%
2023	Fingernails	Christos Nikou	FilmNation Entertainment	Apple TV+	60%
TBA	Sweetsick	Alice Birch	Film4; House Productions	Searchlight Pictures	TBA
TBA	Peaches	Jenny Suen	MK2; One Cool Workshop Limited; Pinky Promise; Undisputed Pictures	Independent Film Company	TBA

Television
Year	Title	Creator	Production company	Network
2020	Mrs. America	Dahvi Waller	Shiny Penny Productions; Gowanus Projections; Federal Engineering; FXP	FX on Hulu
2020	Stateless	Cate Blanchett; Tony Ayres; Elise McCredie	Matchbox Pictures	ABC TV
2024	Disclaimer	Alfonso Cuarón	Esperanto Filmoj; Anonymous Content	Apple TV+

Podcast
Year	Title	Network
2022	Climate of Change with Cate Blanchett and Danny Kennedy	Audible
