= Full motion racing simulator =

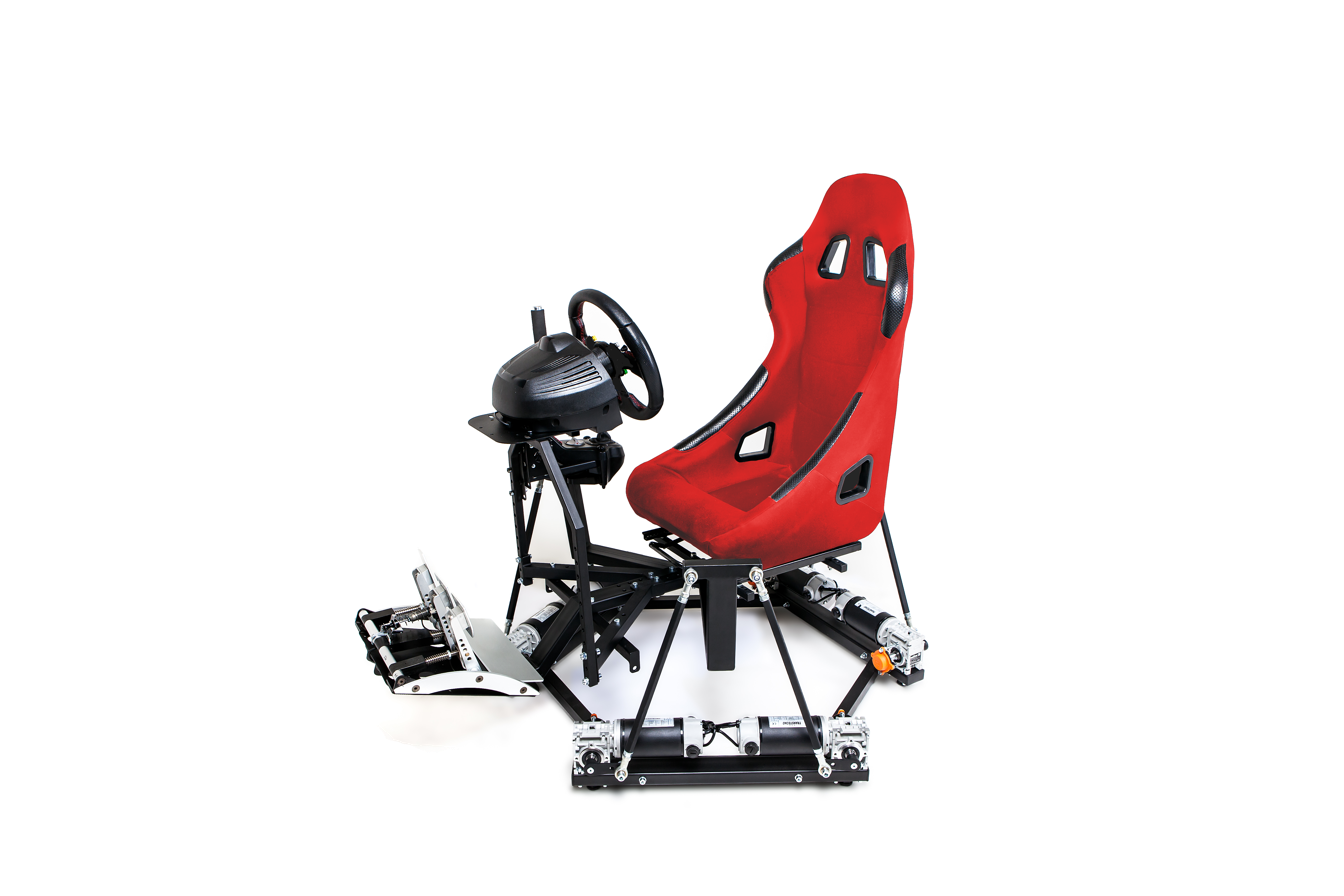
Full motion racing simulator with all 6 degrees of freedom

A full motion racing simulator, sometimes called a full motion sim rig, is a motion simulator that is purposed for racing, and must provide motion simulation in all six degrees of freedom, as defined by the aviation simulator industry many decades ago. The six degrees of freedom coincide with Earth physics, and are commonly referred to (in both aircraft, watercraft and other vehicles) as:

- The three translational movements: Surge, sway and heave (front/back motion, side-to-side motion and up/down motion, respectively)
- The three rotational movements: Roll, pitch, and yaw (rotation around the normal, transverse and longitudinal axes, respectively)

== Different implementations of 6DOF ==
Simulations of these six degrees of freedom are achieved by 2 fundamentally different approaches.

1. Historically by tilting of a motion base (also called a Stewart platform) which also changes the driver's position relative to the Earth's gravity, giving the sensation of acceleration.

2. More recently, a "physics based" methodology achieved through a series of gimbals and linear bearing systems that allow for independent degrees of freedom that work around the center of mass.

In motion simulators, the cockpit or the occupant's seat is moved in coordination with a graphical output. Different examples of racing simulators with motion exist, some of which provide motion only to the driver's seat, and others that move the entire simulator cockpit including all car controls. Further differentiation exists regarding visual display technology and whether the simulators graphical output moves with, and stays relative to the sim, or is static and motionless.

The DOF Reality H6/P6 and SimCraft APEX6 PRO and Cruden are examples of full motion racing simulators implemented in different ways, but both offer motion simulation on all 6 of the degrees of freedom. The DOF Reality and Cruden system utilizes a Stewart platform while SimCraft utilizes a proprietary physics approach with independent degrees of freedom.

In addition to the six degrees of freedom, it is also common to have force feedback in full motion racing simulators, most commonly in the steering wheel, but sometimes even in other controls as well. To create an even more immersive experience, full motion racing simulators are sometimes also combined with virtual reality headsets. Motion platforms has been proven to reduce Cybersickness or Virtual Reality sickness. Using motion platforms participants are capable of playing longer sessions without feeling nauseous. Motion systems succeeded in minimizing mismatches between movement and graphics which brings disorientation to the end. In most systems motion compensation or cancellation software takes its part in minimizing the influence of VR on the brain and health condition.

== DOF comparison ==
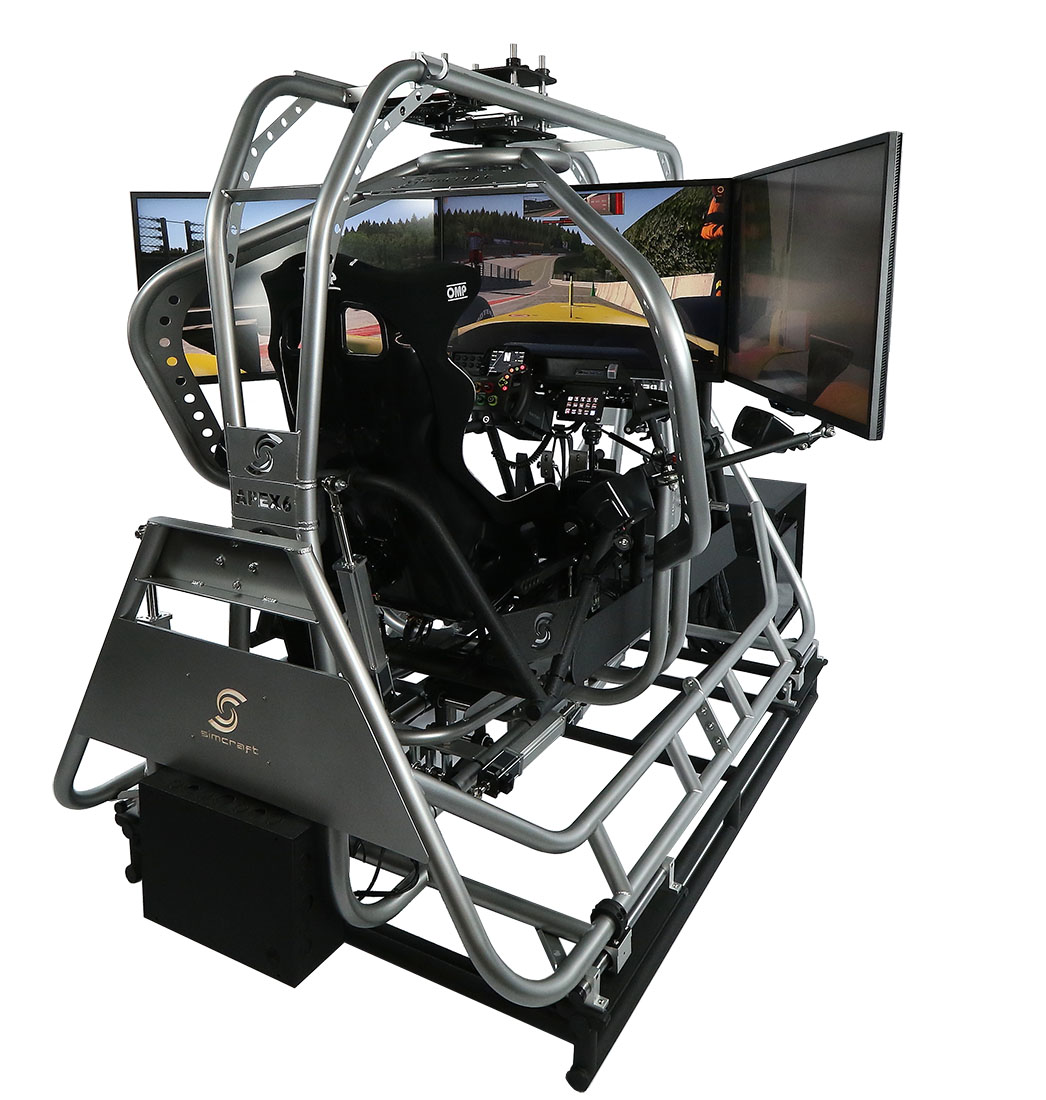
A full motion racing simulator with 6DOF simulation (roll, pitch, yaw, surge, sway and heave).

The number of degrees of freedom (DOF) specifies how many ways a simulator can rotate or translate.

Arguably the two most common use cases are auto racing and flight simulators.

- Auto racing simulators require quick movements, and it is often acceptable to have a short range of motion.
- Flight simulation requires a larger range of motion.

Some common motion simulator setup types include:

- 1DOF with yaw
- 2DOF seat mover - A 2DOF seat mover is one example of a common setup.
- 2DOF with wheel and pedals on a gimball
- 2DOF with wheel and pedals "joyrider"
- 2DOF flatbed
- 3DOF with roll, pitch, and yaw
- 3DOF with heave
- 3DOF with traction loss
- 3DOF with 360 degree rotation
- 4DOF with roll, pitch, yaw, and sway
- 5DOF with roll, pitch, yaw, sway, and surge
- 6DOF physics based
- 6DOF Stewart platform based

== Layout ==
Full motion racing simulators are usually manufactured from steel or aluminum with mounting mechanisms for car controls, such as:

- A steering wheel
- Pedals (usually a throttle and brake pedal, and often also a clutch pedal)
- Gear shifter (usually either an armrest-height mounted H-pattern or dog-leg pattern stick, or a floor mounted sequential stick, or a wheel-mounted paddle shifter)
- Seat, typically some form of a bucket seat

Ergonomics may also attempt to replicate the vehicle being simulated.

== Gallery ==
Stewart platform

== See also ==
- Driving simulator
- Virtual reality simulator
- Racing video game, which refers to all auto racing video games, with many arcade racing games typically use motion simulator cabinets
- Sim racing, collective term for auto racing games which aim to be realistic, but do not necessarily include motion simulation output
- Flight simulator
  - Full flight simulator
- Simulator ride
