= The New Boy =

2023 film by Warwick Thornton

- Theatrical release poster
- Directed by: Warwick Thornton
- Written by: Warwick Thornton
- Produced by: Kath Shelper; Andrew Upton; Cate Blanchett; Lorenzo De Maio
- Starring: Aswan Reid; Deborah Mailman; Wayne Blair; Cate Blanchett
- Cinematography: Warwick Thornton
- Edited by: Nick Meyers
- Music by: Nick Cave; Warren Ellis
- Production companies: Dirty Films; Scarlett Pictures; Screen Australia; Fremantle Australia; Longbridge Nominees; South Australian Film Corporation; Screen NSW
- Distributed by: Roadshow Films
- Release dates: 19 May 2023 (Cannes); 6 July 2023 (Australia)
- Running time: 96 minutes
- Country: Australia
- Language: English

The New Boy is a 2023 Australian fantasy drama film written and directed by Warwick Thornton, and starring Aswan Reid as the title character, alongside Deborah Mailman, Wayne Blair, and Cate Blanchett, who was also a producer of the film. It follows a young Aboriginal Australian orphan boy who is brought into a Christian monastery, run by a renegade nun, where he begins to question his faith and loyalty to his heritage.

The film premiered at the 76th Cannes Film Festival on 19 May 2023, and was theatrically released in Australia on 6 July 2023 by Roadshow Films. It received generally positive reviews from critics.

== Plot ==
In the Australian outback in the mid-1940s Australia, a nameless nine-year-old Aboriginal boy with blonde hair strangles a white horseman. Another horseman fells the boy with a boomerang; then the boy is taken in at a remote orphanage. The monastery is seemingly run by a male priest, who has actually been dead for a year without anyone appearing to know the cause. The lead nun, Sister Eileen, claims to outsiders that the priest is still alive, and forges letters to create this impression. Eileen is supported in her work and her deception by a fellow nun who goes by the nickname "Sister Mum" and a man named George, both of whom are Aboriginal and assimilated to Christian beliefs. Though times are difficult, the nuns care for the boys and desire to protect them through Christian teachings and shared manual work. The boys are not provided with any knowledge of Aboriginal values, language or practices. Their fate is to be forced to leave very early and be employed as farm hands. Sister Mum is implied to have converted to Christianity due to the loss of her two children, while George lives a secure life at the monastery.

The orphan boy, nicknamed the "New Boy", initially struggles to fit in with the other boys, being incapable of speaking or understanding English and lacking any desire for Western behaviour, such as footwear and clothing. After a period of bullying, the New Boy gradually asserts himself physically and emotionally, and becomes accepted by everyone. Throughout this process, the New Boy is shown to possess mysterious supernatural abilities to conjure small balls of light and to heal sick animals and humans.

This period of relative peace is broken by the arrival of a large statue of a crucified Jesus for the monastery's church. The New Boy finds himself drawn to the statue, envisioning it as if it were alive. He feels compelled to deliver offerings of live snakes to the statue, to which everyone else reacts with fear. He also starts to experience stigmata in his hands, with his other supernatural powers becoming confused.

When the New Boy revives a dead snake, a lightning strike causes a fire in the fields, which George and the other boys are forced to put out. Meanwhile, in front of the statue, the New Boy stabs both his hands to mimic the crucified Jesus. Eileen discovers this and, after an initial shock, sees it as a sign of his embrace of Christianity. When George and the other boys return to the monastery, the eldest boy, Michael, has been injured and burnt from putting out the fires. The New Boy uses his powers to heal Michael, which Eileen and George witness.

The New Boy's behaviour and unorthodox infatuation with Jesus disturb everyone, while he sometimes reverts to his old ways. This behaviour includes him secretly taking down the statue to play with it, "heal" it from its crucifixion wounds, and dress it up; it is eventually found by Eileen and put back in the church by George. Wary that the New Boy is yet to abandon his Aboriginal ways, George separates him from the other boys.

After a crisis of faith, believing that the New Boy has been sent to her as a messenger from Christ, Eileen decides to baptise him to cleanse him from his "sins". Although he still has little understanding of Christianity, the New Boy accepts the baptism but he immediately realises that this has permanently destroyed his supernatural abilities. Resigned to his new life, the New Boy begins wearing clothing and footwear. As V-J Day arrives, he tentatively starts living the new life, experiencing acceptance from everyone again, but leaving his future uncertain and his heritage now torn between two vastly different worlds.

== Cast ==
- Aswan Reid as New Boy
- Cate Blanchett as Sister Eileen
- Deborah Mailman as Sister Mum
- Wayne Blair as George
- Shane McKenzie-Brady as Michael
- Tyrique Brady as Matthew
- Laiken Beau Woolmington as David
- Kailem Miller as Steven
- Kyle Miller as James
- Tyzailin Roderick as Henry
- Tyler Rockman Spencer as Johnny
- Andrew Upton and Tyson Pawley as Firefighters

== Production ==
The original idea for the story arose in around 2005, when filmmaker Warwick Thornton wrote a script which drew on his experiences in a Benedictine monastery boarding school as a boy, developed with long-time producer Kath Shelper. During the COVID-19 pandemic, Cate Blanchett suggested to Thornton that they work together on a project, through her film production company Dirty Films. Thornton had originally imagined a Benedictine monk running the monastery and had given his film the working title Father and the Son, but decided to change the gender after realising that the poster and plot outline might give audiences the wrong idea about the film, and in turn created a role for Blanchett.

In February 2022, it was announced that Blanchett would star in the film, written and directed by Thornton. Deborah Mailman and Wayne Blair joined the cast, with Blanchett serving as a producer under her Dirty Films banner. In December 2022, Aswan Reid, Shane Brady, Tyrique Brady, Laiken Woolmington, Kailem Miller, Kyle Miller, Tyzailin Roderick, and Tyler Spencer (the boys) joined the cast. The boys were all newcomers to the screen, and lived onsite during the filming.

Principal photography began in October 2022 and wrapped in December. The outdoor scenes were shot on location near Burra, South Australia.

The score was written by Nick Cave and Warren Ellis.

== Themes and genre ==
Angela Bates, Screen Australia's Head of First Nations, described The New Boy as "a genre-defying film that explores spirituality, culture and colonisation in a way we haven’t seen on screen before".

Thornton said in an interview:

It's a really funny movie and it's a war movie. It's also very open-hearted in an unexpected way.

Of course, this story brings with it the weight of a certain pocket of Australian history. Which always follows us and in a way, as a filmmaker, you always reference this part of Australian history in some way.

But this movie is by no means a history lesson or a lecture.

== Release ==
The New Boy had its world premiere at the 76th Cannes Film Festival, under the Un Certain Regard section, on 19 May 2023. It later had its Australian premiere as the opening film of the 2023 Sydney Film Festival on 7 June, while also playing in the Official Competition, before its theatrical release by Roadshow Films in Australia on 6 July 2023.

The film premiered in the US at Woodstock Film Festival on 28 September 2023.

The film was released in the UK and Ireland by Signature Entertainment on 15 March 2024.

== Reception ==
=== Critical response ===
On the review aggregator website Rotten Tomatoes, 72% of 46 critics' reviews are positive, with an average rating of 6.5/10. The website's consensus reads: "The New Boy bites off more than it can comfortably chew, but this heady exploration of faith and cultural tensions has an ethereal allure."

The Guardian's Luke Buckmaster, while praising Aswan Reid's performance as "the most impressive child performance for some time", described the film as "a cryptic and borderline impenetrable noodle-scratcher stuffed full of heavy religious imagery". He gave it three stars out of five.

The Hollywood Reporter's David Rooney also praised Reid's performance, as well as "the visual power of Thornton's gorgeous compositions...[which] remains transfixing" and found the film overall "engrossing, even when the story strays from its path". However, he thought that a weakness in the script held back Blanchett's performance.

== Awards and nominations ==
| Award | Date of ceremony | Category | Recipient(s) | Result | Ref. |
|---|---|---|---|---|---|
| Cannes Film Festival | 27 May 2023 | Un Certain Regard | Warwick Thornton | Nominated | |
| Sydney Film Festival | 18 June 2023 | Best Film | The New Boy | Nominated | |
| Haifa International Film Festival | 6 October 2023 | Best International Film | The New Boy | Nominated | |
| Almeria Western Film Festival | 14 October 2023 | Best Feature | The New Boy | Nominated | |
| Camerimage | 18 November 2023 | Golden Frog | Warwick Thornton | Won | |
| AACTA Awards | 10 February 2024 | AACTA Award for Best Film | The New Boy | Nominated | |
| AACTA Awards | 10 February 2024 | AACTA Award for Best Actor in a Leading Role | Aswan Reid | Won | |
| AACTA Awards | 10 February 2024 | AACTA Award for Best Actress in a Leading Role | Cate Blanchett | Nominated | |
| AACTA Awards | 10 February 2024 | AACTA Award for Best Actor in a Supporting Role | Wayne Blair | Nominated | |
| AACTA Awards | 10 February 2024 | AACTA Award for Best Actress in a Supporting Role | Deborah Mailman | Won | |
| AACTA Awards | 10 February 2024 | AACTA Award for Best Direction | Warwick Thornton | Nominated | |
| AACTA Awards | 10 February 2024 | AACTA Award for Best Cinematography | Warwick Thornton | Won | |
| AACTA Awards | 10 February 2024 | AACTA Award for Best Screenplay, Original or Adapted | Warwick Thornton | Nominated | |
| AACTA Awards | 10 February 2024 | AACTA Award for Best Production Design | Amy Baker | Won | |
| AACTA Awards | 10 February 2024 | AACTA Award for Best Costume Design | Heather Wallace | Nominated | |
| AACTA Awards | 10 February 2024 | AACTA Award for Best Editing | Nick Meyers | Nominated | |
| AACTA Awards | 10 February 2024 | AACTA Award for Best Casting | Anousha Zarkesh | Nominated | |
| AWGIE Awards | 15 February 2024 | Feature Film – Original | Warwick Thornton | Nominated | |
