= Benaud =

Benaud is a surname. Notable people with the surname include:

- John Benaud (born 1944), Australian cricketer
- Richie Benaud (1930–2015), Australian cricketer and cricket commentator and writer

== See also ==
- Benaud Trio, an Australian musical trio based in Melbourne
