= Hajur (film) =

- हजुर
- Directed by: LSM, Pinki Sris Rana
- Written by: Sahara Sharma (story), LSM (screenplay)
- Produced by: AbhiManyu Dixit, Sahara Sharma
- Starring: Prashanti Poudyal; Suraj Dixit; Sahayog Adhikari; Archan Dixit
- Production company: Gauthali Entertainment
- Release date: 2022
- Running time: 10 minutes
- Country: Nepal
- Language: Nepali

Hajur (Nepali: हजुर) is a Nepali short drama film released in 2022, co-directed by LSM and Pinki Sris Rana, with a story by Sahara Sharma and screenplay by LSM. It was produced by AbhiManyu Dixit and Sahara Sharma through Gauthali Entertainment. The film is about Sarita, a young mother who is attempting to juggle remote work along with her family duties during the COVID-19 pandemic.

It received a Special Mention Award at the 10th Nepal Human Rights International Film Festival (2022) and a Jury Special Mention- Nepal Panorama at the Kathmandu Mountain Film Festival (2022).

== Plot ==
Sarita is a young mother who, throughout the COVID-19 pandemic, tries to balance her professional work-from-home responsibilities alongside the challenges of maintaining a home and caring for her family. As responsibilities pile up and accumulate from every direction, her endurance reaches a breaking point.

== Cast ==
The cast includes:

- Prashanti Poudyal as Sarita
- Suraj Dixit
- Sahayog Adhikari
- Archan Dixit

== Production ==
LSM is a filmmaker hailing from western Nepal and an alumnus of the Media Studies program at Kathmandu University School of Arts. He has produced films both on his own and in partnership with Gauthali Entertainment.

Pinki Sris Rana is a culture and arts reporter at The Kathmandu Post and presenter and researcher of the show Tarka Bitarka. She is also a graduate of the Media Studies Programme at Kathmandu University School of Arts.

== Release ==
Hajur was screened at the Indie Meme Film Festival, a South Asian independent cinema platform based in Austin, Texas, United States.

== Accolades ==
| Year | Festival | Award | Result |
|---|---|---|---|
| 2022 | Kathmandu International Mountain Film Festival | Jury Special Mention- Nepal Panorama | Won |
| 2022 | Nepal Human Rights International Film Festival | Special Mention Award | Won |
