= Expired (2022 film) =

- Theatrical film poster
- Directed by: Ivan Sen
- Written by: Ivan Sen
- Produced by: David Jowsey; Angela Littlejohn; Ivan Sen; Greer Simpkin
- Starring: Hugo Weaving; Ryan Kwanten; Jillian Nguyen
- Cinematography: Ivan Sen
- Edited by: Ivan Sen
- Music by: Ivan Sen
- Release date: March 18, 2022 (United States)
- Country: Australia
- Language: English

Expired (alternatively titled Loveland in other countries) is a 2022 Australian independent science fiction film directed by Ivan Sen and starring Ryan Kwanten, Hugo Weaving and Jillian Nguyen.

== Plot ==
Recently hired mercenary Jack begins to wonder why his body is mysteriously deteriorating. Pursued by robotic agents, he seeks help from Dr. Bergman, a reclusive scientist who might hold the answers to his grim situation. Meanwhile, Jack meets April, a mysterious nightclub singer, and eventually falls in love with her. However, he soon discovers that dark forces are surrounding the young woman.

== Cast ==
- Ryan Kwanten as Jack
- Hugo Weaving as Dr. Bergman
- Tim Lo
- Jillian Nguyen as April
- David Field as Sam
- Matour Franck
- Andrew Ng

== Release ==
It was released theatrically on 18 March 2022. It also became available for online rental on the same day in the United States.
