= The Adventures of Figaro Pho =

Australian animated television series

- DVD cover
- Created by: Luke Jurevicius
- Composers: Michael Darren; Luke Jurevicius
- Country of origin: Australia

Production
- Producers: Dan Fill; Frank Verheggen; David Webster
- Running time: 8 minutes
- Production companies: Screen Australia; Australian Broadcasting Corporation; Ambience Entertainment; Chocolate Liberation Front; Fulcrum Media Finance

Original release
- Release: 2012 – 2013

The Adventures of Figaro Pho is an Australian children's animated television series produced by Chocolate Liberation Front. It was followed in 2015 by The New Adventures of Figaro Pho.

== Synopsis ==
Both series are about Figaro Pho, a character with every known phobia. One unique attribute also shared among franchises of the series is that there is almost no dialogue and no text. Instead the shows require strong animated physical-performance-based drama, music score and sound effects to carry the story.

The character Pho has a slim body and neck with a large smooth head, bald apart from a curl of hair on top, reminiscent of Paul Livingston's character Flacco. His only companion is a mechanical dog with a penchant for whimsical invention and hatred of the postman, one of the few recurring characters.

Figaro Pho has been the star of his own two-season television series as well as an anthology series of 26 90-second shorts and three touchscreen games.

== Characters ==
=== Main cast ===
- Figaro - A 9-year-old child prodigy who is afraid of mostly everything in the town of Cogsville.
- Rivet - Figaro's sweet and cheerful 4-year-old pet robotic dog that will always protect him if he is in danger.

=== Recurring cast ===
- Juliet - Figaro's 9-year-old next door neighbor and love interest.
- Rudy - A skateboarding 9-year-old boy who lives life to the extreme.
- Prudence - A hyperactive 8-year-old girl who has an obsession with Figaro.
- Ronald - A chubby 9-year-old boy with a runny nose.
- Penny - A sweet 8-year-old girl scout that offers cookies to the denizens of Cogsville.
- Cornelius - Cogsville's local mailman that often gets hurt anytime he delivers to Figaro.
- Dotty - A wrinkly old lady who is occasionally seen doing various jobs all over Cogsville.
- Boris - Figaro's obese gardener that has an incredibly bad odor.
- Uncle Ernesto - Figaro's quirky explorer uncle that has terrible hygiene.
- Leon - Figaro's adult cousin who is an athletic TV star and a master chef.

== Episodes ==
=== The Adventures of Figaro Pho ===
subtitled Fun, Fears and Foul Odours
20 episodes were released on ABC DVD in 2013 (Cat. R-113653-9)

1. Fear of Fish
2. Fear of Being Alone
3. Fear of Boredom
4. Fear of Relatives
5. Fear of Rejection
6. Fear of Mosquitoes
7. Fear of Thieves
8. Fear of Foul Odours
9. Fear of Baths
10. Fear of Baldness
11. Fear of Hunger
12. Fear of Clowns
13. Fear of Shrinking
14. Fear of Elevators
15. Fear of Skin
16. Fear of Becoming a Vampire
17. Fear of a Rival
18. Fear of Meteorites
19. Fear of Everything
20. Fear of Being Weak

=== The New Adventures of Figaro Pho ===
1. Figaro on Ice
2. The Bag-Piped Piper
3. Figarette Pho
4. School of Cool
5. Dr Dread
6. Kung Fu Pho
7. Zombie Pho
8. Pho is in the Air
9. Bandage Brouhaha
10. Tiny Terrors
11. Nightmare on Edam Street
12. Flower of Fury
13. Myth or Pho?
14. Vertigo Pho
15. Spider Pho
16. Loose Tooth
17. Time Traveller
18. Mailman Mania
19. FrankenRivet
20. Gumball Boogie
21. Pizza Boy
22. Neat Freak
23. Eye Witless
24. Laugh Attack
25. The Soup
26. Baby Bandit
27. Run Figaro Run!
28. Party Pooper
29. Waltergeist
30. Stage Fright
31. Valentine's Day
32. Fame Game
33. The Grim Reaper
34. Double Pho
35. Pharaoh Pho
36. Cup Cake Carnage
37. Figaro's Big Adventure
38. Odd Socks
39. Camp Fear

== 2009 version ==
Figaro Pho is an Australian animated television series produced by Vishus Productions about a boy called Figaro Pho dealing with and overcoming his many phobias. With each phobia/episode starting with a different letter of the alphabet from A to Z, there are 26 short episodes.

== The New Adventures of Figaro Pho ==
The New Adventures of Figaro Pho
- Created by: Luke Jurevicius
- Composer: Christopher Larkin
- Country of origin: Australia

Production
- Producers: Dan Fill; Luke Jurevicius; Frank Verheggen
- Running time: 7–8 minutes
- Production companies: Screen Australia; Australian Broadcasting Corporation; Ambience Entertainment; Chocolate Liberation Front; Fulcrum Media Finance

Original release
- Release: 2015 – 2016

The New Adventures of Figaro Pho is the 2015 sequel to the 2012 series The Adventures of Figaro Pho.

== Broadcast ==
The first series is available in over 100 countries on Hulu, Netflix, Cartoon Network Latin America, Pakapaka, BBC Canada and iTunes. In Canada, it airs on both Family Channel and CHRGD.

== Creation ==
Figaro Pho is the brainchild of creator and animation director Luke Jurevicius. The TV series and the games are produced by Australian production company Chocolate Liberation Front.

Creator Luke Jurevicius suffers from fears and phobias himself, and drew a lot on personal experience in the creation of the series. Jurevicius not only directs the program, but he also performs many of the key roles including doing the voice of Figaro Pho and composing a large part of the music.

The original shorts were first commissioned by the South Australian Film Corporation and The Australian Broadcasting Corporation’s New Media and Digital Services Division as an innovative property for broadcast on ABC2 and online at ABC Online. The program was eventually produced for broadcast on ABC1, ABC2, ABC3, ABC iView. Following the success of the original shorts, ABC Kids commissioned 39 episodes of The Adventures of Figaro Pho for ABC3.

In 2014, producers Chocolate Liberation Front formed a partnership with Luma Toons, a new branch of the leading SFX studio Luma Pictures, to produce 39 episodes for the second series entitled The New Adventures of Figaro Pho. The program, which was entirely produced in Australia, was the first long form series produced by Luma.

The New Adventures of Figaro Pho started airing in August 2015.

== Games ==
In 2014 ABC Commercial published a series of three Figaro Pho branded games for touch screen devices. These games are available through iTunes and the Google Play store.

== Reception ==
The series has been reviewed favorably, comparing it to animation from Tim Burton. The series has been recognized for its humour, music and its animation and special effects. It won several international awards, including 2013's Best Children's Program on three continents (Australian Academy of Cinema and Television Awards; The Asian Television Awards and Kidscreen New York). The program also picked up awards for writing, digital effects, animation and post production.

== Cast and crew ==
=== Key cast ===
- Luke Jurevicius
- Charlotte Rose Hamlyn
- Ryan Reynolds
- Maggie Felton

=== Writers ===
- Tim Bain
- Craig Behenna
- Ray Boseley
- Dan Fill
- Robert Greenberg
- Bruce Griffiths
- Charlotte Rose Hamlyn
- Mark Shirrefs
- Frank Verheggen

=== Producers ===
- Dan Fill
- Luke Jurevicius
- Frank Verheggen
