= SimCraft =

- Company type: Private
- Industry: Vehicle Simulation, Flight Simulation, Racing Simulation
- Founded: 1998
- Founder: William MacDonald and Sean Patrick MacDonald
- Headquarters: Marietta, Georgia, United States
- Key people: Alana MacDonald, Matthew Thill, Matthew Nix
- Products: APEX1, APEX2, APEX3, APEX4, APEX5
- Number of employees: 25
- Website: www.SimCraft.com

SimCraft is an American motion simulation design and manufacturing company headquartered just outside Atlanta, Georgia. Focused primarily on racing driver development, SimCraft technology has also been applied to flight as well as promising and pioneering health research on neuroplasticity restoration in cancer patients. The motion simulator technology, in development since 1998, was designed to recreate the manner in which vehicles move in earth physics. SimCraft offers a range of motion simulation products that provide a true tactile motion experience for sim racing and flight simulation. The company's core innovation and technology is the simulation of movement through proprietary physics based software interfaces and a patent pending hardware architecture based on Center of Mass principles of motion. The company's product applications range principally by variation in chassis design and material and are found in usage from military training/research, medical research, neuroplasticity rehabilitation, professional training, entertainment, gaming enthusiast, and esports.

== History ==
=== William MacDonald ===
William MacDonald, SimCraft's co-founder

The history of SimCraft begins in 1997, with William MacDonald; a recently retired engineer from Eastman Kodak and flight simulation enthusiast who established a sole proprietorship and began a retirement project. Unable to find an affordable motion platform for flight simulation, Mr. MacDonald undertook the building of his own system using components available at almost any hardware store. The result of this effort, which took over half a year, was a 3DOF full motion simulator named "SimCraft" - with full roll, pitch, and yaw axes. This first complete system was a different approach to motion simulation with all three rotational axis.

=== First Prototype ===
The first working iteration of this $1000 motion chassis was made mainly from lumber and PVC but contained elements that still form the underlying concepts of the modern SimCraft motion system.

==== Center of Mass (CoM) Architecture ====
The key component of the system is the concept of using a balanced, center of mass architecture in which the motion chassis rotates about its Center of Mass (CoM). This setup requires a much smaller amount of force to provide a large range of motion, and is different from the Stewart platform type designs, the standard approach in commercial applications over the past several decades, that require large forces for motion. This system of movement is also described by the physics of aircraft. The CG architecture model is intended to mimic a real vehicle's rotational motions since the rotation axes (roll, pitch, and yaw) are mutually perpendicular, always fixed, rotating at or near the actual center of mass (of the sim), and intersecting at a single, static point - as they are in both land and air based vehicles. This approach also separates the degrees of freedom, making roll, pitch, and yaw independent, and independently controlled, from each other.

==== Pneumatic Actuation ====
PVC pneumatic actuator and digital valve

Although the company's technology has changed over a decade and is now based on electromechanical control, that eliminate latency and safety concerns, the first prototype's motion was supplied by homemade PVC pneumatic actuators and powered by a 4 horsepower canister vacuum cleaner. The vacuum cleaner was capable of producing 2.0 PSI, this pressure coupled with a 3" bore linear actuator produced approximately 20 pounds-force or around 90 newtons. The systems positioning was controlled by a series of solenoid based digital valves custom designed by William MacDonald.

==== Joystick Controlled Motion & Output Controlled Revision ====
This first motion system developed in 1997/1998 used a "follow the joystick" approach which is based on the input to the system instead of considering the output result of a simulation. The first modification was to switch to an output, or vector physics, based motion system to represent the movement of the vehicle in a simulation. This approach is currently used in SimCraft's zero latency, physics based, motion control software.

==== Website and eCommerce ====
William MacDonald completed several versions of this motion simulation method in fully functional applications and launched www.SimCraft.com in 1998 to sell his plans for $30 to the community of flight simulation enthusiasts. A "SimKit" was later offered, including some off-the-shelf control components for $350. These plans and kits were sold and distributed in over 20 countries from 1999 to 2001.

==== Second Prototype and passing of William MacDonald ====
William MacDonald was working on a next generation motion system when he died unexpectedly in January 2002. This second prototype was not completed or even fully understood as the plans were never documented, but it was determined from the completed work that the new design concept also called for the use of a pneumatic control medium.

=== SimCraft LLC ===
Mr. MacDonald's son Sean Patrick formed an LLC in 2004 to continue development of the architecture and refine the product application for both simulated training and gaming entertainment. During the first year of the LLC's founding, market research conducted by Sean Patrick and long time friend and fellow technologist Michael Boardman determined there were various markets for a motion enhanced simulation experience, but that a complete DIY project was not a viable business model. Thus, the build plans for the first SimCraft motion simulator were open sourced and released to the worldwide flight simulation community on SourceForge.net.

=== CORE Architecture Development ===
SimCraft worked to refine the Center of Mass architecture and with the specific goal of producing a commercial level 2DOF and 3DOF motion simulator. Electromechanical actuation was adopted as the sole medium for motion control, to eliminate air pressure latency and performance issues, and proprietary rotary "knuckle" bearings were developed to form the CORE architecture and create the adaptability of various chassis designs.

=== Extruded Aluminum 2DOF Chassis and Tubular Aluminum 3DOF Chassis ===
The first application of the CORE architecture was a 2 degree of freedom (roll and pitch) extruded aluminum chassis. This prototype design provided proof of concept and a testing sled for incorporating software motion integrations including physics based racing and flight simulation. A tubular aluminum chassis was later fabricated allowing for the addition of the yaw axis of rotation.

=== Advanced Technology Development Center ===
The company was admitted to Georgia Tech's business incubator program, the ATDC in the summer of 2006.

=== The 8 Series ===
SimCraft's motion technology develops the 8 Series, featuring the latest in the company's chassis engineering. The APEX is the motorsport version of the sc830 for training professional and amateur race car drivers. This model is used by the Army Corps of Engineers' S.A.V.E. project to study, understand, and simulate the dynamics of a vehicle being driven at high speeds in a loose surface environment.

=== S.A.V.E. ===
In November 2007, the U.S. Congress passed legislation funding the SAVE Program, Synthetic Automotive Virtual Environments. The President signed the legislation into law the same month. The SAVE Program is headed up by the Cold Regions Research and Engineering Laboratory (U.S. Army, Hanover, New Hampshire) and Vehicle Control Training, LLC (Franconia, New Hampshire). Congress has authorized funding for FY09 and FY10, FY11 is probable. The SAVE Program is supported in the United States House of Representatives by Democrat Paul Hodes and in the US Senate by Republican Judd Gregg. The SAVE Program enjoys bipartisan, bicameral support. The program includes partners of Ford Motor Company, the US Army, SimCraft, and individual researchers at Georgia Tech and MIT.

SimCraft has been selected as the motion simulator supplier for synthetic training development and is also the lead software development resource on the integration of other technologies used within the environment.

SAVE came to existence because motor vehicle accidents are the leading cause of accidental death within the military. This cost in lives lost, injury, and damage cuts across all aspects of the military machine and is a limiting factor in mission delivery. The solution proposed by SAVE is the development of three technologies: effective synthetic expert driver skills training, leap-ahead adaptive active safety systems, and autonomous vehicles. The research effort and focus represents an advancement in active safety systems such as ABS braking, dynamic vehicle stability control, and active steering.

The first and primary objective of the research is to develop, field, and validate synthetic fundamental driving skills training. At the end of the first year of research, the SAVE program has validated a synthetic environment that effectively trains the following skills: correct eye placement, straight line braking (ABS/non-ABS), accident avoidance, and rollover avoidance.

=== APEX sc830 Launched ===
In January, 2009 SimCraft launched the APEX Motion Racing Simulator at the Consumer Electronics Show in Las Vegas, Nevada. The APEX sc830 (later rebranded the APEX3) is a 3 DOF racing simulator with pitch, roll, and yaw motion; fabricated from tubular chromoly steel with powder coated finish. The sim is customized with various controls, visual, and audial technologies, adaptable to individual users.
