= Jillian Nguyen =

Australian actress

- Born: Nguyen Tran Huyen Dieu; 1992 or 1993 (age 32–33); Sungai Besi, Malaysia
- Occupation: Actress
- Notable credits: Expired; Barons; Hungry Ghosts

Jillian Nguyen (born 1992 or 1993) is an Australian actress. She has played main roles in the 2022 film Loveland, the 2022 ABC television series Barons, and the 2023 animated film Scarygirl, as well as supporting roles in the 2020 SBS ensemble drama Hungry Ghosts, the 2021 film Millie Lies Low, and the 2023 mystery drama One Night.

== Early life and education ==
Nguyen was born Nguyen Tran Huyen Dieu in a camp for Vietnamese refugees in Sungai Besi, Malaysia, in 1992 or 1993. Her parents had fled Vietnam separately, met in the camp in 1990 and were married, then stayed in the camp until the family was granted refugee status in Australia in 1994. Nguyen was 14 months old when the family arrived in Australia.

She grew up in Melbourne, graduated from the University of Melbourne, and pursued additional acting training at Melbourne's 16th Street Actors Studio. She trained with Philippe Gaulier at École Philippe Gaulier in France.

== Career ==
After acting on stage in a 2018 production of the Daniel Keene play The Serpent's Teeth, Nguyen began her screen career with a brief appearance in the 2019 film True History of the Kelly Gang. In 2020 she appeared as Sophie Tran in Hungry Ghosts, a four-episode ensemble drama about the lives of Vietnamese families in Australia that was written by Vietnamese-Australian screenwriters and starred several Vietnamese-Australian actors. Nguyen played Carolyn, the duplicitous best friend of Ana Scotney's main character Millie, in the Michelle Savill-directed 2021 film Millie Lies Low. In a review for Screen Daily, Tara Judah noted that Nguyen was "tasked with playing a two-faced bestie in too little screen time" and criticized the director for focusing too much on the main character rather than the supporting cast.

Her first larger roles came in 2022. In the science-fiction film Loveland, Nguyen played April, a nightclub singer who forms a mysterious relationship with the protagonist Jack. The New York Times called Loveland, which was released under the title Expired in the US, "an art-house fugue disguised as a genre flick". In the ABC television series Barons, about the early days of a fictional Australian surfwear company modeled after Quiksilver, Nguyen played Tracy Dwyer, the fiancée, and later wife, of the company's founder. Louise Rugendyke of the Sydney Morning Herald noted that in comparison to the rest of the main characters, Tracy is "smarter than all of them".

Nguyen joined the voice cast of the animated film Scarygirl in the lead role of Arkie. She also joined the cast of Shayda, directed by Noora Niasari, with whom Nguyen had previously worked on the short film Tâm. A supporting role as a journalist in the 2023 Emily Ballou-written Paramount+ mystery drama One Night followed.

== Filmography ==
=== Film ===
Year	Title	Role	Notes
2019	True History of the Kelly Gang,	Molly Kane	
2020	Hook Up	Lucy	Short
2020	Tâm	Tâm	Short
2020	The Story of Lee Ping	Lee Ping	Short
2021	Millie Lies Low	Caroyln	
2022	Expired	April	Film
2023	Shayda	Vi	
2023	Scarygirl	Arkle (voice)	
2024	Me & Mazzy Melancholy	Suitcase	Short
2024	Light Can't Escape	Harriet	Short

=== Television ===
Year	Title	Role	Notes	Ref
2020	Hungry Ghosts	Sophie Tran	4 episodes	
2021	Clickbait	Alison	1 episode	
2022	Barons	Tracy	8 episodes	
2023	The Clearing	Sylvie Lee	3 episodes	
2023	One Night	Eden	4 episodes	
2024	White Fever	Kai	2 episodes	
2025	Apple Cider Vinegar	Poh	4 episodes	
2025	Warm Props			
