= Sophie Byrne =

Australian film and TV producer

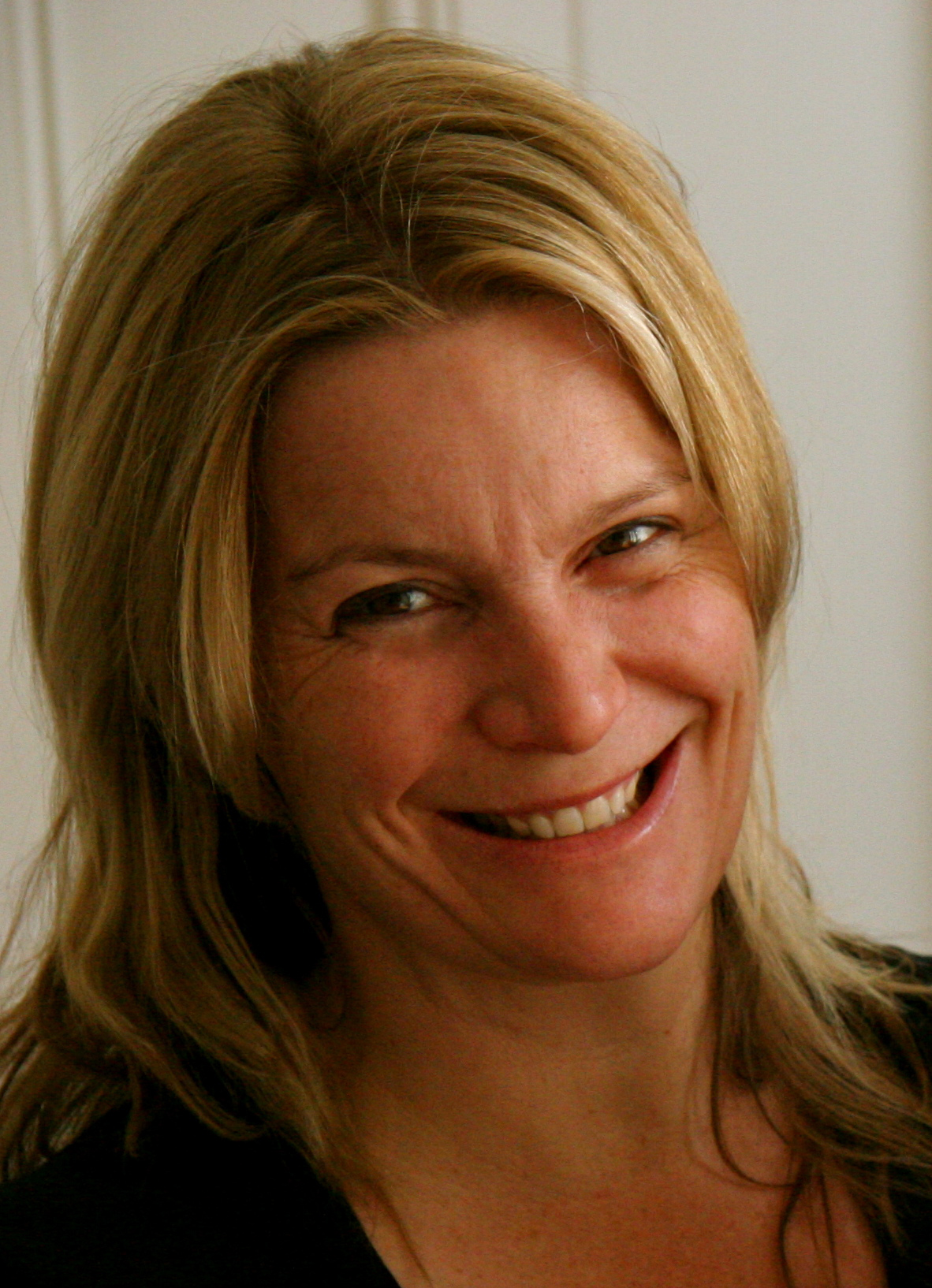
Photograph of producer Sophie Byrne

Sophie Byrne is an Australian film and TV producer, best known for the Academy Award winning animated short The Lost Thing.

== Career ==
Byrne worked as a Senior Producer at Passion Pictures London for ten years. There she produced many award-winning projects, including the initial pilot for the hugely successful concept band Gorillaz—created by Jamie Hewlett (Tank Girl comic) and Damon Albarn (Blur)—and their seminal ‘Clint Eastwood’ music video.

Returning to Melbourne, Australia in 2002 Byrne started Passion Pictures Australia, optioned the acclaimed cult concept Scarygirl and has worked closely with artist Nathan Jurevicius to successfully expand the brand across all media including producing the online gaming prototype, which was nominated for the 2009 AFI Screen Content Innovation Award.

In 2010 Byrne produced the Academy Award-winning short film, The Lost Thing, based on Shaun Tan's picture book. After being introduced to the book, Sophie tracked Shaun down and asked him to co-direct the short film adaptation with Andrew Ruhemann, and cast Tim Minchin in the role of the narrator.

A feature film adaption of the Scarygirl concept, is currently in production with the female-led Brisbane-based production studio Like A Photon Creative Co-Producing and Executive Producer John Stevenson (Kung Fu Panda, Shrek, Madagascar) and features an all star Australian cast.

In 2014 Byrne formed a new production entity, Highly Spirited. Under this company, Byrne has a high-end animated TV series based on Shaun Tan's Tales From Outer Suburbia in development with Flying Bark Productions, and Lally Katz (Wentworth, Spirited) attached to write, and a feature film adaptation of Shaun Tan's internationally acclaimed graphic novel The Arrival.

She is also in production on 10 x 12 min TV series Eddie’s Lil’ Homies inspired by the popular children’s books Eddie’s Lil’ Homies by AFL Football legend, Eddie Betts, which is produced and financed with the assistance of Australian Children’s Television Foundation, Netflix, National Indigenous Television.

Sophie was recently the Supervising Animation Producer of the Australian Unit on Where Is Anne Frank, a 2D animated feature film from Oscar-nominated Ari Folman (Waltz With Bashir).

== Awards ==
- AACTA Award for Best Short Animation
- Kodak Inside Film Award for Best Short Animation
- St Kilda Film Festival Best Animation
- Greg Tepper Award for Outstanding Achievement by Film Victoria
