= Vico Thai =

Australian actor

- Born: Vico Thai; Australia
- Occupation: Actor
- Spouse: Aline Thai
- Children: Paquinn Thai

Vico Thai is an Australian actor, known for his role as Lam Bui on Disney+ series Last Days of the Space Age which premiered on Disneyplus and Hulu. His other notable roles include Justin Yang on ABC TV's award-winning drama series Total Control and as Riz in Foxtel's Dangerous TV series.

== Early life ==
Thai was born in Saigon, Vietnam, and raised in Sydney in the suburb of Bankstown. He is of Vietnamese, Chinese and French ancestry. He began performing at an early age before receiving a prestigious national scholarship to study at the Australian Theatre for Young People (ATYP). Thai was nominated by the Ten Network for a National Young Achiever Award for his achievements in performance.

In 2002, Thai's younger sister Jenny Thai (1997–2002) died from her second open heart surgery.

== Career ==
Thai's first role was a guest star on Young Lions, screened on the Nine Network. Thai was next cast in his breakout role, as one of the new young stars on Foxtel's AFI nominated show Dangerous starring alongside Joel Edgerton. Thai's roles continued, appearing next in East West 101 with guest appearances in Underbelly, comedy Review with Myles Barlow and guest starring alongside Guy Pearce in the mini series Jack Irish.

Recently, Thai has continued his work with guests roles on ABC's Rake and international crime mystery thriller series Harrow. Thai was recently cast as a lead in Hungry Ghosts as Quang, premiering on SBS. In 2021 Vico Thai was cast as a lead alongside award-winning actresses Rachel Griffiths and Debra Mailman in the second season of Total Control. In 2024 Thai plays a starring role in Disney+ original series Last Days of the Space Age as Lam Bui, starring alongside Linh Danh Pham, Iain Glen, Radha Mitchell and Jesse Spencer.

== Filmography ==
- TV Series

Year	TV Show	Character	Notes
2024	Last Days of the Space Age	Lam Bui	8 episodes
2022	Total Control	Justin Yang	6 episodes
2020	Hungry Ghosts	Quang	4 episodes
2019	Reckoning	Young doctor	1 episode
2018	Rake	Zhang Le Ping	2 episode
2018	Harrow	Wei's Bodyguard	1 episode
2013	Peter Allen, Not the Boy from OZ	Hong Kong Hilton Barman	2 episode
2012	Jack Irish	Lester	1 episode
2009	Review with Myles Barlow	Vince	1 episode
2010	Underbelly	Quan	1 episode
2007	East West 101	David Ngo	1 episode
2007	Dangerous	Riz	8 episodes
2002	Young Lions	Khai	1 episode

- Films

Year	Film	Character	Notes
2018	Danger Close	Vietnamese Soldier	Lead
2014	My Sister's Wedding	Jay	
2013	Change of Our Lives	Dr Minh	
2013	Felony	Vico	
2012	Wish You Were Here	Vietnamese leader	
2010	Mother Fish	Chau	Lead
2009	Cedar Boys	Police Officer	
2009	Missing Water	Chau	Lead
2007	In Our Name	American Marine	
