= Shayda (film) =

2023 film by Noora Niasari

- Theatrical release poster
- Directed by: Noora Niasari
- Written by: Noora Niasari
- Produced by: Vincent Sheehan; Noora Niasari
- Starring: Zar Amir Ebrahimi; Osamah Sami; Mojean Aria; Jillian Nguyen; Rina Mousavi; Selina Zahednia; Leah Purcell
- Cinematography: Sherwin Akbarzadeh
- Edited by: Elika Rezaee
- Production companies: Origma 45; The 51 Fund; HanWay Films; Dirty Films; Parandeh Pictures
- Distributed by: Madman Films
- Release dates: 19 January 2023 (Sundance); 5 October 2023 (Australia)
- Running time: 118 minutes
- Country: Australia
- Languages: English; Persian
- Box office: $286,573

Shayda is a 2023 Australian drama film written, directed and co-produced by Noora Niasari, with Vincent Sheehan co-producing. The film stars Zar Amir Ebrahimi, Osamah Sami, Mojean Aria, Jillian Nguyen, Rina Mousavi, Selina Zahednia, and Leah Purcell. The story follows an Iranian immigrant woman in Australia who is raising her young daughter as the two live in a women's shelter.

The film had its world premiere at the 2023 Sundance Film Festival on 19 January 2023, and was released in cinemas in Australia on 5 October 2023. It won the CinefestOZ Film Prize in September 2023, and was selected as the Australian entry for the Best International Feature Film category for the 2024 Academy Awards.

== Plot ==
The story is inspired by Niasari's childhood experiences. It starts in 1995, in an airport. Shayda, an Iranian immigrant, and Joyce are teaching Shayda's young daughter, Mona, to run to the security in case if her father, Hossein, kidnaps her and brings her to the airport.

Shayda and Mona live in a women's shelter run by Joyce along with several other women with children. Joyce is a caring person, but the crammed atmosphere of the shelter often leads to conflicts. Joyce and Shayda write down her testimony with an assistance of an interpreter. Mona has nightmares and wets her bed.

Shayda grows wheat sprouts and cooks Iranian dishes in preparation for Nowruz, teaching Mona the traditional ways to celebrate it, such as setting the haft-sin table. A new woman, Lara, arrives to the shelter.

The judge gives Hossein the right to have weekly unsupervised meetings with Mona, which terrifies Shayda, but she cooperates. Hossein tries to impress Shayda and Mona with gifts and reassures them that he is a changed man, but they are not convinced. Shayda resumes contact with her Iranian Australian friend Elly. Shayda goes to a club with the shelter women and Elly, and meets her kind Canadian cousin Farhad.

Mona demands from Shayda to go celebrate Chaharshanbe Suri in a park; Shayda goes with Elly and her friends despite her fear of meeting judgemental Iranians. Hossein becomes more and more abusive towards Shayda when he picks Mona. Shayda becomes friends with Lara and teaches her divination with The Divān of Hafez; the police find Lara's son and he moves into the shelter. Shayda shows the women how to dance in Iranian style. During a visit Hossein promises Mona to take her to see the Lion King, but is instead spying on Shayda. Upon return, he threatens her with kidnapping Mona and tries to chase Joyce's car.

Shayda comes to Elly's Nowruz party and notices that her presence makes several guests to leave. She sees Farhad; they dance and flirt. Hossein comes to the party unannounced and assaults Shayda and Farhad. Someone sets the women's shelter on fire; one of the residents is hospitalised. Women move to another place.

Next year at Nowruz, Shayda opens presents with Mona. They live in a separate accommodation now; Shayda is studying nursing at a university. Shayda and Joyce bring Mona to a scheduled visit to a prison where Hossein is serving his sentence.

The film concludes with a montage of video recordings made by the director, a young child, and her mother, during Nowruz.

== Cast ==
The cast includes:

- Zar Amir Ebrahimi as Shayda
- Selina Zahednia as Mona, Shayda's daughter
- Osamah Sami as Hossein, Shayda's abusive husband
- Leah Purcell as Joyce, the caring woman running the shelter
- Mojean Aria as Farhad, a love interest
- Jillian Nguyen as Vi, another woman in the shelter
- Rina Mousavi as Elly
- Eve Morey as Lara
- Lucinda Armstrong Hall as Renee
- Bev Killick as Cathy
- Jerome Meyer as Pierre

== Production ==
Shayda was written and directed by Noora Niasari. Most of the dialogue is in Persian. The story is based on Niasari's memories of living at the women's shelter as a child, and features Persian cultures and traditions, including Nowruz (Persian New Year), with its theme of renewal and rebirth.

The film was executive produced by Cate Blanchett via her Dirty Films company, and co-produced by Niasari and Australian filmmaker Vincent Sheehan. Blanchett said in an interview: "Vincent and Noora had been developing Shayda for some time and they brought it to us toward the end of the development process to help secure financing and key cast members... We knew this story was strong and had perspective unlike any Australian film we had seen before. It's an intensely personal and domestic scenario but the story Noora drew out of it, we felt had wider cultural resonances. Noora's short films proved she was a visceral filmmaker with an emotionally rich point of view".

The film features the 1991 Rozalla song "Everybody's Free (To Feel Good)", which Niasari grew up with, and said that it "just beautifully exemplifies that sense of a woman having agency", at Shayda's euphoric moment of liberation.

Key to the film is the relationship between mother and daughter Mona, with the two actresses, Zar Amir Ebrahimi and Selina Zahednia (who was cast in Melbourne) bonding in real life and continuing to maintain a connection afterwards.

== Release ==
Shayda had its world premiere at the 2023 Sundance Film Festival on 19 January 2023, where it won the Audience Award in the World Cinema Dramatic competition. In February 2023, Sony Pictures Classics acquired distribution rights to the film for North and Latin America, the Benelux countries, eastern Europe, Portugal, the Middle East, and Turkey.

In August 2023, it was screened as the opening film in the Melbourne International Film Festival for its Australian premiere, closed the Locarno Film Festival in Switzerland, and was screened at the Toronto International Film Festival in September. It was also screened in the "Flash Forward" section at the 28th Busan International Film Festival on 8 October 2023. The film was selected in country focus section "Best of Contemporary Australian Cinema" at the 29th Kolkata International Film Festival in India in December 2023.

Shayda was released in cinemas in Australia by Madman Films on 5 October 2023. The film was released in the United States on 1 March 2024 and by Vertigo Releasing in the United Kingdom on 8 March 2024.

== Reception ==
=== Critical response ===
On the review aggregator website Rotten Tomatoes, 97% of 96 critics' reviews are positive, with an average rating of 7.6/10. The website's consensus reads: "An understated yet impactful story of female empowerment. Shayda establishes first-time feature filmmaker Noora Niasari as a remarkably assured talent." Metacritic, which uses a weighted average, assigned the film a score of 76 out of 100, based on 16 critics, indicating "generally favorable" reviews.

=== Accolades ===
Shayda was selected, on 30 August 2023, as the Australian entry to the Best International Feature Film category for the 2024 Academy Awards in the United States.

The film won the CinefestOZ Film Prize Western Australia in September 2023, worth A$100,000. The prize is the largest cash film prize in Australia, and one of the largest in the world.

Niasari won the Australian Directors' Guild Award in the category Best Direction in a Feature Film (Budget $1m or over), in December 2023.

In March 2024, she won the Film Critics Circle of Australia Award (FCCA Award) for best screenplay.

| Award | Date of ceremony | Category | Recipient(s) | Result | Ref. |
|---|---|---|---|---|---|
| Sundance Film Festival | 27 January 2023 | Audience Award – World Cinema Dramatic Competition | Noora Niasari | Won | |
| Sundance Film Festival | 27 January 2023 | Grand Jury Prize – World Cinema Dramatic Competition | Noora Niasari | Nominated | |
| Directors Guild of America Awards | 10 February 2024 | Outstanding Directing – First-Time Feature Film | Noora Niasari | Nominated | |

== See also ==
- List of submissions to the 96th Academy Awards for Best International Feature Film
- List of Australian submissions for the Academy Award for Best International Feature Film
