= Bangers (1999 film) =

- Directed by: Andrew Upton
- Written by: Andrew Upton
- Produced by: Andrew Upton; Cate Blanchett
- Starring: Cate Blanchett; Lynette Curran
- Cinematography: Ross Emery
- Edited by: Matt Villa
- Music by: Chris Abrahams
- Production company: Dirty Films
- Release date: 1999 (Melbourne)
- Running time: 9:00
- Country: Australia
- Language: English

Bangers is a 1999 Australian short film starring Cate Blanchett. Her husband Andrew Upton wrote, produced, and directed the film. It was their first collaboration from their production company "Dirty Films". Bangers was later included in the 2005 compilation film Stories of Lost Souls.

== Plot ==
Cate Blanchett portrays a marginally successful career woman preparing dinner for her gruff and unsympathetic mother. As she cooks the mashed potatoes and sausages, she tells an indifferent audience of her mother and cat about a recent promotion at work. While she rants about her job it becomes apparent that she is in the middle of a mental breakdown that culminates in burned sausage and mashed potatoes all over the floor.

== Cast ==
- Cate Blanchett - Julie-Anne
- Lynette Curran - Mother
- Meggs the cat - Mr. Funnybones
