= One Night (Australian TV series) =

Australian television series

- Created by: Emily Ballou
- Screenplay by: Emily Ballou
- Directed by: Catharine Miller; Lisa Matthews
- Starring: Jodie Whittaker; Nicole da Silva; Yael Stone
- Composer: Amanda Brown
- Country of origin: Australia
- Original language: English
- No. of series: 1
- No. of episodes: 6

Production
- Executive producers: Hannah Creelman; Simon Maxwell; Emily Ballou; Sophia Mogford
- Producers: Ian Collie; Rob Gibson; Ally Henville
- Cinematography: Gary Phillips; Emma Paine
- Running time: 45–49 minutes
- Production companies: Easy Tiger Productions; Motive Pictures

Original release
- Network: Paramount+
- Release: 1 September 2023

One Night is an Australian drama television series made by Easy Tiger Productions and Motive Pictures for Paramount+. It is written and created by Emily Ballou and stars Jodie Whittaker, Nicole da Silva and Yael Stone.

== Plot ==
The series follows Tess, Simone and Hat, three friends whose lives have been changed by the traumatic events of one night in their home town twenty years previously. After that night, only Hat remained in the town, but they all reunite when Simone comes back to look after her father with dementia, and Tess brings her wife and kids from the UK to spend a year in Sydney. Without telling the other two, Simone has written a novel, One Night, about what happened to them. As it becomes a bestseller, the women relive the painful memories and discover old secrets.

== Cast ==
- Jodie Whittaker as Tess
  - Mikaela Binns-Rorke as young Tess
- Nicole da Silva as Simone
  - Bridgette Armstrong as young Simone
- Yael Stone as Hat
  - Bella Ridgway as young Hat
- George Mason as Joey
  - David Howell as young Joey
- Erroll Shand as Trevor
  - Shane Osborne as young Trevor
- Damien Strouthos as Mark, Hat's husband
  - Alan Dalziel as young Mark
- Kat Stewart as Vicki, Tess' wife
- Tina Bursill as Helen, Tess' mother
- William Zappa as Don, Hat's father
- Noni Hazlehurst as Mary, Joey and Trevor's mother
- Jillian Nguyen as Eden
- Harper Simon as Lily, Tess and Vicki's daughter
- Jude Hyland as Arthur, Tess and Vicki's son
- Fiona Press as Laura, Hat's mother
- Wadih Dona as Baris
- Les Hill as Detective Clemens
- Anthony Brandon Wong as Mediator
- Zac Burgess as Jason
- Helen Thomson as Lindy

== Production ==
Emily Ballou is creator and writer of the project with episodes directed by Catherine Millar and Lisa Matthews. Ian Collie, Rob Gibson and Ally Henville are producers for Easy Tiger Productions on the project. Simon Maxwell is executive producer for Motive Pictures, with Harriet Creelman, co-executive producer and Emily Ballou also serving as executive producer.

=== Casting ===
Jodie Whittaker, Yael Stone, and Nicole da Silva were announced as leads on the series in February 2023. Also announced as among the cast were George Mason, Erroll Shand, Noni Hazlehurst, Tina Bursill, Damien Strouthos and Jillian Nguyen.

=== Filming ===
Filming started in early 2023 in Sydney, Australia and the Illawarra region of New South Wales.

== Broadcast ==
The series was released in Australia on Paramount+ on 1 September 2023. It is set to come to Paramount+ UK and Ireland November 24, 2023 but was removed by February 2024. It is now available to stream in Australia on Netflix and on ITVX in the UK. It began broadcasting on ITV1 in the UK on 16 August 2025.
