= Hungry Ghosts (TV series) =

- Genre: Drama; Horror
- Written by: Jeremy Nguyen; John Ridley; Alan Nguyen; Timothy Hobart; Michelle Lee
- Directed by: Shawn Seet
- Starring: Catherine Văn-Davies; Suzy Wrong; Jillian Nguyen; Ryan Corr; Bryan Brown; Clare Bowen; Vico Thai; Gareth Yuen
- Country of origin: Australia
- Original language: English
- No. of seasons: 1
- No. of episodes: 4

Production
- Executive producers: Debbie Lee; Sue Masters
- Producers: Timothy Hobart; Stephen Corvini
- Running time: 50 minutes
- Production company: Matchbox Pictures

Original release
- Network: SBS
- Release: 24 August 2020

Hungry Ghosts is an Australian dramatic horror series, released on SBS and SBS On Demand on 24 August 2020. The four-part miniseries is directed by Shawn Seet and produced by Stephen Corvini and Timothy Hobart with executive producers Sue Masters and Debbie Lee. The series is written by Timothy Hobart, Michelle Lee, Alan Nguyen, Jeremy Nguyen and John Ridley.

== Synopsis ==
Hungry Ghosts is a character-driven ghost story that explores the lives of three generations of Vietnamese Australian families, all haunted by the traumatic events of the Vietnam War and the literal ghosts of their past. Set in contemporary Melbourne, Australia, the story begins when a power amulet is broken and Quang (Vico Thai), a vengeful spirit, is unleashed from his tomb and wreaks havoc across the Vietnamese diasporic communities. He brings other spirits along with him. The turn of events threatens to unleash these families' deepest fears and expose long buried secrets.

The series' hero, May Le (Catherine Văn-Davies), is a struggling Vietnamese Australian chef who has lost everything. She is estranged from her mother and swindled by her ex-boyfriend. She soon discovers that she has the special supernatural powers needed to fight the evil spirits who have followed her family home.

== Cast and characters ==
=== Le family and friends ===
- Catherine Văn-Davies as May Le: An aspiring chef who begins to understand that she has the power to battle the evil spirits.
- Suzy Wrong as Roxy Ling: May's best friend, a trans woman and gifted clairvoyant.
- Susan Ling Young as Stella Le: May's estranged mother.
- Linda Hsia as Phuong Le: May's grandmother.
  - Ann Truong as Young Phuong Le
- Ryan Corr as Ben Williams: An intern doctor who struggles with the fact he can't always prevent patients from dying. He serves as a love interest to May.

=== Nguyen family ===
- Ferdinand Hoang as Anh Nguyen: Patriarch of the Nguyen family and a former ARVN soldier.
  - Koa Nuen as Young Anh
- Gabrielle Chan as Lien Nguyen: Matriarch of the Nguyen family and Anh's wife.
  - Crystal Wang as Young Lien
- Gareth Yuen as Paul Nguyen: Anh and Lien's adult son who struggles with his relationship with his father.
  - Cyrus Lee as Young Paul (4 Years Old)
  - Benjamin Nguyen as Young Paul (16 Years Old)
- Justine Clarke as Clare Nguyen: Paul's wife.
- Christopher Quyen as Daniel Nguyen: Paul and Clare's son who struggles with his identity.
- Chloe Chung as Holly Nguyen: Paul and Clare's youngest child.

=== Tran family ===
- Lap Phan as Dr. Sang Tran: A successful doctor and head of emergency at a local Melbourne hospital.
- Oakley Kwon as Diane Tran: A successful woman who busies herself with charity work.
- Jillian Nguyen as Sophie Tran: A bio med student who is possessed by an evil spirit. She is the daughter of refugees, Sang and Diane Tran
- HaiHa Le as Tracy Tran: Sang and Diane's eldest daughter. A tiger mum to 6-year-old Ethan and a massive over-achiever.
- Timothy Nguyen as Ethan: Tracy's 6-year-old son.

=== Stocktons ===
- Bryan Brown as Neil Stockton: A photographer famous for his collection of Vietnam War photographs.
  - Joe Neathway Brown as Young Neil.
- Clare Bowen as Liz Stockton: Neil Stockton’s daughter

=== Ghosts ===
- Vico Thai as Quang: An evil spirit released from his tomb that wreaks havoc on the protagonists.
- Hoa Xuande as Khoa: Lien's first husband, an ARVN soldier who was killed on the battlefield during the Vietnam War.
- Trackie Tran as Hoc
- Yuchen Wang as Thao

=== Others ===
- Susie Porter as Catherine Taylor, a UN worker infected by ghosts.
- Max Brown as James Hoang
- Lawrence Mah as Thay Duc
- Joanne Nguyen as Ngoc
- Gary Sweet as Hugh
- Robert Pham as Thay Minh
- Warren Lee as Harry Trang

== Production ==
Filming began in May 2019 in Melbourne, Australia. The series is a Matchbox Pictures production with Stephen Corvini and Timothy Hobart producing and Shawn Seet as a director. The series was funded by Screen Australia in association with SBS and Film Victoria. NBCUniversal International Distribution will distribute the series internationally.

The cast includes more than 30 Asian Australian actors and 325 Asian Australian extras, which is a first for Australian television.

== Reception ==
The series was favourably reviewed. Giselle Au-Nhien Nguyen, writing for the Guardian, gave it four (of five) stars and described the series as "unconventional and fascinating". Both Nguyen, and Christina Lee reviewing the series for The Conversation, noted similarities in plot ideas between the series and the Harry Potter stories. Lee thought the series "gripping" and praised the soundtrack, though she did remark that within it the "romance is rushed and predictable, and it is disappointing that among such a rich Asian-Australian cast several of the Anglo-Australian cast members are headlined to promote the series".

== Episodes ==
No. overall	Episode	Directed by	Written by	Original release date	Aus. viewers
1	"Episode 1"	Shawn Seet	Timothy Hobart	24 August 2020	87,000
2	"Episode 2"	Shawn Seet	John Ridley	25 August 2020	N/A
3	"Episode 3"	Shawn Seet	Jeremy Nguyen, Alan Nguyen and Timothy Hobart	26 August 2020	N/A
4	"Episode 4"	Shawn Seet	Michelle Lee and John Ridley	27 August 2020	N/A
