= Millie Lies Low =

2021 New Zealand film

- Promotional poster
- Directed by: Michelle Savill
- Written by: Michelle Savill; Eli Kent
- Produced by: Desray Armstrong; Angela Littlejohn
- Starring: Ana Scotney; Jillian Nguyen; Chris Alosio; Sam Cotton; Karen O'Leary
- Cinematography: Andrew Stroud
- Edited by: Dan Kircher
- Production company: Sandy Lane Productions
- Distributed by: REASON8; Film Movement; Signature Entertainment
- Release date: 2021
- Running time: 100 minutes
- Country: New Zealand
- Language: English

Millie Lies Low is a 2021 New Zealand comedy-drama film. It is the first feature film directed by Michelle Savill, who co-wrote the screenplay with Eli Kent. The film stars Ana Scotney, Jillian Nguyen, and Chris Alosio. It had world premiere in 2021 at the New Zealand International Film Festival. and international premiere in 2022 at the 72nd Berlin International Film Festival.

== Premise ==
After missing her flight to New York due to a sudden panic attack, Millie decides to stay in Wellington and post fake updates to social media to convince others that she successfully took up an internship in New York City. Meanwhile, she spies on her friends to find out what they really think about her.

== Cast ==
- Ana Scotney as Millie
- Jillian Nguyen as Carolyn
- Chris Alosio as Henry
- Sam Cotton as Scott
- Karen O'Leary as Campus Security
- Rachel House as Marlene

== Production ==
In 2013, director and screenwriter Michelle Savill missed a flight from New Zealand to France, where she was supposed to attend the premiere of her first film, a short film called Ellen is Leaving. The experience gave her the idea to write a movie script around a character who handled the same type of situation differently. Filming began in Wellington in 2020, but was quickly suspended due to lockdown measures during the COVID-19 pandemic in New Zealand. With the support of the New Zealand Film Commission, filming resumed six months later at Wellington-area locations including Wellington Airport and Cuba Street.

Millie Lies Low had its world premiere at the COVID-delayed 2021 New Zealand International Film Festival. In February 2022 the film had its international premiere in the Generation 14plus section of the Berlin International Film Festival. In March 2022 the film had its North American premiere at SXSW. International distribution is handled by London-based REASON8 that sold the UK and Ireland distribution rights to Signature Entertainment and the US rights to Film Movement. The film was released in US theaters in 2023. Millie Lies Low grossed approximately US$50,000 across all theatrical releases.

== Reception ==
As of June 2024, the film holds an approval rating of 86% on review aggregator Rotten Tomatoes, based on 21 reviews by critics. On Metacritic, the film has a weighted average score of 60 out of 100, based on reviews by 5 critics, indicating "mixed or average reviews".

In The Guardian, Phil Hoad called Millie Lies Low a "shrewd and promising debut", reserving special praise for Ana Scotney's performance of the lead character. The movie received a mixed review in The New York Times, where Ben Kenigsberg also praised Scotney but criticised the film's plausibility, the screenplay's treatment of the consequences of Millie's actions. Tara Judah of Screen Daily similarly credited the performance of Scotney, whom she called a "standout talent", but also criticised the film for focusing too much on Millie, thereby leaving supporting characters and narrative threads unexplored.
