= Gareth Yuen =

Australian actor

- Born: Melbourne, Victoria, Australia
- Education: National Institute of Dramatic Art (BFA)
- Years active: 1992–present

Gareth Yuen is an Australian actor best known for his role as Dax Lo, the Blue Ranger on the 2007 television series Power Rangers: Operation Overdrive. He appeared at the Power Morphicon in June 2007. He is a 2005 graduate of Sydney's National Institute of Dramatic Art (NIDA).

== Career ==
Yuen has been on many Australian films television shows ranging from Sky Trackers, Neighbours, Head Start, Bed of Roses, Kath & Kim, Underbelly, and Party Tricks. He was cast in Knowing starring Nicolas Cage and Liam Hemsworth, however, his scenes were cut out in the final film. He was the Blue Ranger Dax Lo in Power Rangers: Operation Overdrive in 2007 and in 2011, he appeared in the New Zealand independent feature My Wedding and Other Secrets alongside Michelle Ang and Cheng Pei-pei.

In 2016, he was cast in comedian and The Daily Show senior correspondent Ronny Chieng's comedy series Ronny Chieng: International Student, which was part of the Australian Broadcasting Corporation's Comedy Showroom where viewers vote which pilot they want green lit.

In 2019, he joined the main cast for SBS's limited series Hungry Ghosts.

== Filmography ==
=== Film ===
Year	Title	Role	Notes
2004	Stiff	Uniformed Officer	
2007	The Jammed	Lai	Feature film
2007	Petit Homme		Video short
2009	Knowing	Donald	Feature film, scenes cut
2009	Saved!	Justin Chan	Feature film
2009	Bani Ibrahim	Rick	Short film
2010	Matching Jack	Radiologist	Feature film
2011	My Wedding and Other Secrets	Jason	Feature film
2011	Red Orchard	Son	Short film
2013	The Audition	Kizamu, the producer	Short film
2014	Replacement Protocol	Hashi	Short film

=== Television ===
Year	TV Title	Role	Notes
1992	Round the Twist	Horse	Episode: "Copy Cat"
1994	Sky Trackers	Joe	26 episodes
1999	Queen Kat, Carmel & St Jude	Andrew	Episode: "Winter / Jude"
1999	Stingers	Leon	Episode: "Swarm"
2000	Neighbours	Tom Wu	Episode #1.3523
2000	Eugénie Sandler P.I.	Lifesaver	Episode #1.5
2001	Head Start	Loc Minh Vu	22 episodes
2001–2002	Ponderosa	Hop Sing	15 episodes
2002	MDA	Dr. Angus Yu	2 episodes
2002	Marshall Law	Quoc Le	Episode: "Snorting Charlie"
2004	Kath & Kim	Fong	Episode: "Cactus Hour"
2006	Tripping Over	Charlie	3 episodes
2007	Power Rangers Operation Overdrive	Dax Lo	Series regular, 32 episodes
2008	Underbelly	Foreign Young Man	Episode: "Scratched"
2008	City Homicide	Li Phat Lung	Episode: "Life After Death"
2010	Bed of Roses	Chin Tsung Chi	8 episodes
2010	Lowdown	Golf Administrator	Episode: "A Lavish Singer"
2013	Upper Middle Bogan	Lin	Episode: "Behind You!"
2014	Party Tricks	Lucas Fry	5 episodes
2016	Comedy Showroom: Ronny Chieng - International Student	Denedict	TV pilot
2016	Hunters	Jeff	Episode: "Telegraph"
2017	Doubt	Sammie Kim	Episode: "Top Dog/Underdog"
2019	Ms Fisher's Modern Murder Mysteries	Chung Li	Episode: "Seasoned Murder"
2019	Hungry Ghosts	Paul Nguyen	Main cast; limited series
