= Scarygirl (video game) =

2012 adventure-platform video game

- Developer: TikGames
- Publisher: Square Enix
- Director: Adrian Ludley
- Producer: Peter Dassenko
- Platforms: Windows; PlayStation 3 (PSN); Xbox 360 (XBLA)
- Release: Xbox 360; January 18, 2012; PlayStation 3: NA: January 24, 2012; PAL: February 15, 2012; Windows; March 22, 2012
- Genre: Platform
- Mode: Co-op mode; single-player

Scarygirl (also stylized as ScaryGirl) is a platform game for the Xbox 360's Xbox Live Arcade, PlayStation 3's PlayStation Network and Microsoft Windows. Scarygirl was previously a graphic novel by Nathan Jurevicius, a Flash game, and a downloadable title for the PlayStation Portable. It was developed by TikGames and published by Square Enix.

Scarygirl places the player in control of a girl who is sent from her home to a far-away city on a rescue mission. The girl is able to jump, grapple, and hover her way through seven game worlds, either alone or with another player in a cooperative multiplayer mode. Combat is handled through combining strings of light and heavy attacks, with grapple-based attacks becoming available once enemies take enough damage. Roundly praised for Jurevicius' art, ScaryGirl received otherwise mixed reviews upon its release. Critics found fault with both the control scheme and its combat system, although boss battles did receive some praise.

== Gameplay ==
Scarygirl is a side-scrolling platform game. Players control the protagonist Scarygirl as she navigates and fights through twenty-one stages spread across seven distinct worlds. The game uses a 2.5D visual style and employs parallax scrolling to create visual depth.

Outside of combat, Scarygirl navigates the game world by running, jumping, gliding, and using her tentacle arm to grapple onto objects. Scarygirl eventually gains access to a feather attachment that can replace the hook on her tentacle arm, allowing Scarygirl to hover and reach otherwise inaccessible locations. Stages contain deadly traps that have to be avoided, often by grappling over them, and most stages contain at least two paths through the stage, although after choosing one the option to backtrack and take the other route exists. Crystals, which can be used to purchase combat upgrades for both combat and exploration, and heart fragments, which increase Scarygirl's maximum health, are scattered throughout stages. In order to get all of the crystals and heart fragments, players will have to traverse both paths through stages that have more than one path.

In combat, Scarygirl has light and heavy attacks, which can be strung together to form combos. Heavy attacks have the ability to launch enemies in the air. After enemies take a certain amount of damage, they can be grappled and thrown or used to bludgeon other enemies. Additional moves are available for purchase using crystals, such as a grappling attack that heals Scarygirl or an attack that turns Scarygirl's tentacle into a club with a smashing attack. Additional weapons, which replace the hook at the end of Scarygirl's tentacle arm, are also available for purchase, and include an anchor and a fan. Scarygirl charges a meter when she attacks, and is able to enter a "Rage Mode" once it is fully charged. In rage mode Scarygirl gains the ability to eat enemies, restoring her own health in the process.

Scarygirl does not have an online component, but does support two-player cooperative multiplayer. The second player is able to drop in or out of the game at any time, and plays as Bunniguru. Bunniguru is faster than Scarygirl and has a different, martial arts inspired, set of moves in combat, but lacks Scarygirl's ability to grapple.

== Plot ==
In the game, the player controls Scarygirl, a young girl with an eye patch, a sewn-shut mouth and a hook-capped tentacle for one arm. The girl, an orphan, was raised and cared for by Blister, an intelligent, mustached octopus that built the girl a tree house to live in. Plagued by recurring nightmares that featured a mysterious man, the girl consults Bunnyguru, a rabbit that lives in the bottom of the tree where the girl makes her home. Bunniguru offers a vision of a city far away from the girl's home. The girl is then sent by Blister into a forest to investigate why the Tree of Life is losing its leaves, where she discovers that one of the keepers of the forest has been kidnapped and taken to the city from Bunnyguru's vision, and becomes tasked with seeing to the keeper of the forest's safe return.

== Reception ==
Reception

Aggregate score
Aggregator	Score		
Aggregator	PC	PS3	Xbox 360
Metacritic	N/A	66/100	63/100

Review scores
Publication	Score		
Publication	PC	PS3	Xbox 360
The A.V. Club	N/A	N/A	C
Edge	N/A	N/A	3/10
Eurogamer	N/A	N/A	6/10
GameSpot	N/A	N/A	6/10
GamesRadar+	N/A	N/A	3.5/5
Gamezebo	60/100	N/A	N/A
GameZone	N/A	6.5/10	N/A
IGN	N/A	7.5/10	7.5/10
Official Xbox Magazine (US)	N/A	N/A	6.5/10
PlayStation: The Official Magazine	N/A	6/10	N/A
The Escapist	N/A	N/A	4/5
Metro	N/A	N/A	6/10

The PlayStation 3 and Xbox 360 versions received "mixed or average reviews" according to the review aggregation website Metacritic. Critics praised the game's visuals, with Nathan Meunier of GamesRadar+ stating that the Xbox 360 version "really stands out" as one of the "more visually impressive and creatively designed downloadable offerings" in recent years. Peter Eykemans of IGN wrote that "the art highlights the journey" and that "the overall aesthetics are beautiful". Edge, in a highly critical review, called the Xbox 360 version "successful only as an interactive showcase of Jurevicius' art". Simon Parkin of Eurogamer, in a review that was much kinder to the same console version overall, also called the art and animation "the strongest aspects of the game". Several reviewers compared the same console version's visuals to the style developed by Tim Burton.

The gameplay itself was viewed in a significantly harsher light. Several critics took issue with the controls, which were viewed as imprecise, both in the platforming and in the combat phases of the game. Reviewers took issue with various parts of the combat system. Several reviewers found combat against large groups of enemies to be frustrating. Jason Venter of GameSpot singled out a specific combat stage taking place on an airship as particularly demonstrative of the Xbox 360 version's shortcomings in combat, calling the scenario "cheap". Venter did, however, have praise for the game's boss battles, which he described as "a nice change of pace because victory relies more on pattern memorization and intuition than manic combat". Edge echoed the praise for the boss battles, and both reviews lamented that such segments were not more common.

Reviews were mixed on the co-op mode. While reviewers praised Bunnyguru's martial arts-inspired moveset, they did not like Bunnyguru's inability to grapple, which limits the second player's utility in some situations. Edge also complained that even when there were two players playing, the camera would always center on Scarygirl, even if that meant that Bunnyguru wound up off screen. Reviews were also mixed for the exploration and collection aspects of the game. Parkin described these aspects by stating that: "Branching paths through levels add the illusion of depth but, for players who wish to collect 100 per cent of the gems in a stage, trekking backwards and forwards through a level is an inelegant slog." Eykemans found that the game's branching paths created difficulty for players seeking to gain a rating of "perfection", but went on to recommend the game to people who enjoy searching for collectables.

== In other media ==
Scarygirl is the protagonist of the eponymous Australian 3D animated film from 2023 with voice actors Anna Torv, Tim Minchin, Deborah Mailman and Sam Neill in the main roles.
