= Emily Ballou =

Australian-American poet, novelist and screenwriter

- Born: Milwaukee, Wisconsin, U.S.
- Education: University of Wisconsin–Milwaukee (BA); University of Sydney (MLitt)
- Occupations: Poet; novelist; screenwriter

Emily Ballou is an Australian-American poet, novelist and screenwriter. Her poetry collection The Darwin Poems, a verse portrait of Charles Darwin, was published by University of Western Australia Press in 2009. It was written as part of an Australia Council for the Arts residency at the Tyrone Guthrie Centre in County Monaghan, Ireland.

== Background ==
Emily Ballou was born in Milwaukee, Wisconsin. She studied Film and English at University of Wisconsin–Milwaukee, graduating with a Bachelor in Fine Arts with Honours and completed a Master of Letters in Gender and Cultural Studies at the University of Sydney. She subsequently immigrated to Australia. She now lives in Glasgow, Scotland.

== Career ==
She wrote the "Anouk" and "Aisha" episodes of the Australian Broadcasting Corporation's television mini-series The Slap, the original adaptation of Christos Tsiolkas' novel of the same name, which won the 2012 AWGIE Awards for Television Mini-Series (Adaptation). It was aired in the UK on BBC Four and nominated for a Royal Television Society Programme Award, a BAFTA Award and an International Emmy Award.

Ballou has also written episodes of BBC One/FX Taboo, Channel 4/AMC Humans, BBC One's Case Histories (series 2, "Nobody's Darling"), ITV's Scott & Bailey, National Geographic's TV movie American Blackout, co-written with Ewan Morrison, and Family, directed by Shaun Gladwell in the anthology film The Turning, adapted from Tim Winton's book of short stories and screened in the Berlinale Special Galas section of the 64th Berlin International Film Festival. Her television series One Night started filming in February 2023.

She is also the author of the novels Father Lands (Picador, 2002) and Aphelion (Picador, 2007), as well as the picture book One Blue Sock (Random House, 2007) (with illustrations by Stephen Michael King).

== Awards and nominations ==
- 1997 – Judith Wright Award for Poetry for the poem "Enter"
- 2003 – The Sydney Morning Herald Best Young Novelist for Father Lands
- 2009 – Anne Elder Award: Highly Commended for The Darwin Poems
- 2009 – Wesley Michel Wright Prize for The Darwin Poems
- 2010 – ALS Gold Medal: Shortlisted for The Darwin Poems
- 2010 – Mary Gilmore Prize: Shortlisted for The Darwin Poems
- 2010 – New South Wales Premier's Literary Awards: Shortlisted for The Darwin Poems
- 2010 – Western Australian Premier's Book Awards: Shortlisted for The Darwin Poems

== Bibliography ==
=== Books ===
- —— (2002). Father Lands. Picador. ISBN 9780330363846.
- —— (2007). One Blue Sock. Random House Australia. ISBN 9781741662283. Illust Stephen Michael King.
- —— (2007). Aphelion. Picador. ISBN 9780330423120.
- —— (2009). The Darwin Poems. University of Western Australia Press. ISBN 9781921401275.

=== Anthologies ===
- 2008 – "On the Splice", Best Australian Short Stories
- 2009 – "Here Is a Hair from Her Head", Best Australian Short Stories
- 2010 – "Darwin as Metaphor", Journal 19: Interdisciplinary Studies in the Long Nineteenth Century, Birkbeck: University of London, No. 11, pp. 1–17.
- 2010 – "The Beach", The Penguin Book of the Ocean
