= Amir Farid =

Australian musician

Amir Farid (Persian: امیر فرید) is an American-born Iranian-Australian classical pianist and chamber musician based in New York City. He has played piano in the Benaud Trio as well as the principal accompanist for the senior performing ensemble of the Australian Children's Choir.

== Early life and education ==
Amir Farid was born in Palo Alto, California. He is the son of the celebrated Iranian theatre and film artist Manouchehr Farid. Following the Iranian Revolution of 1979, Manouchehr Farid left Iran for the United States. Later the family emigrated to Australia.

Farid studied at the University of Melbourne, graduating with honours in 2004.

Between 2003 and 2005 he attended the Australian National Academy of Music, where he worked with Geoffrey Tozer, Rita Reichman, and Timothy Young.

Later, Farid then undertook postgraduate studies in London at the Royal College of Music with Andrew Ball. He graduated in 2009 with distinction, as a scholar supported by the Gordon Calway Stone Memorial Award.

== Career ==
Farid has had a career as a pianist.

Since 2005 and as of 2025, Farid has been the pianist in the Benaud Trio, along with violinist Lachlan Bramble, and cellist Ewen Bramble. They have given concerts around the country, won prizes, and in November 2015 they were ensemble-in-residence at the Adelaide Chamber Music School. Influenced by pop and jazz music, the trio play a repertoire that spans over 70 works, from Haydn to contemporary composers.

== Awards and nominations ==
In 2006 he won the first prize of the Australian National Piano Award.

In 2007 he was given the Encouragement Award at the Lev Vlassenko Piano Competition. In the same year he won the Geoffrey Parsons Award, an award for accompanists held by The Accompanists' Guild of SA Inc.

=== AIR Awards ===
The Australian Independent Record Awards (commonly known informally as AIR Awards) is an annual awards night to recognise, promote and celebrate the success of Australia's Independent Music sector.

Year	Nominee / work	Award	Result
2013	Hymne à l’amour	Best Independent Classical Album	Nominated
2015	Amir Farid Plays Javad Maroufi: Golden Dreams and Other Works	Best Independent Classical Album	Won
