= Persian Film Festival =

Persian Film Festival Australia (PFFA)
- Location: Australia
- Founded: 2011
- Awards: Golden Gazelle Award
- Language: Persian; English
- Website: persianfilmfestival.com

The Persian Film Festival Australia (PFFA), is an annual competitive film festival dedicated to showcasing works by Persian-speaking filmmakers from around the world. The festival typically takes place over ten days between April and May, presenting a curated selection of feature films, documentaries, and short films. Several awards are presented, including the Golden Gazelle Award for Best Feature Film, Best Documentary, and Best Short Film.

PFFA showcases an uncensored and carefully curated selection of features, documentaries, and short films. The festival offers Australian audiences a rare and enriching opportunity to engage with captivating stories from one of the world's most esteemed cinematic traditions – films that might not otherwise reach Australian screens. As of 2011, the festival's director is Amin Palangi.

== History ==
The Persian Film Festival Australia was founded in 2011 by Iranian-Australian filmmaker Dr Amin Palangi. The inaugural edition was held in Sydney and expanded to other Australian capital cities, hosted at Palace Cinemas.

Since its inception the festival has been a platform for promoting Persian cinema and fostering cultural exchange between Australian and Persian-speaking communities. The festival has gained international recognition, attracting filmmakers from Iran and the broader Persian-speaking world. It has provided a space for exploring themes of identity, migration, and social issues, resonating with Australia's multicultural landscape.

PFFA has also hosted Australian premieres of films by prominent directors, including Oscar-winning filmmaker Asghar Farhadi and Academy Award nominee Mohammad Rasoulof.

== Competition and film prizes ==
The Golden Gazelle Award, inspired by an ancient Persian winged gazelle dating back to the Achaemenid Empire (4th century BC), symbolizes artistic vitality and intuition. Each year, a jury evaluates films in competition and presents awards in the following categories:

- Best Feature Film
- Best Documentary
- Best Short Film

== Cultural and social impact ==
PFFA has been a strong advocate for Persian-speaking filmmakers who address themes of freedom and justice. Through its programming, the festival has provided a platform for untold stories and critical perspectives that might not otherwise reach Australian audiences. By bridging cultural divides, it offers a rare opportunity for audiences to engage with Persian cinema and explore universal themes of love, family, resilience, and human spirit.

== Film Festival editions ==
- 1st Persian Film Festival (23–26 February 2012)
- 2nd Persian Film Festival Australia (2013)
- 3rd Persian Film Festival Australia (2014)
- 4th Persian Film Festival Australia (2015)
- 5th Persian Film Festival Australia (2016)
- 6th Persian Film Festival Australia (2017)
- 7th Persian Film Festival Australia (2018)
- 8th Persian Film Festival Australia (2019)
- 9th Persian Film Festival Australia (2020)
- 10th Persian Film Festival Australia (26 April to 7 May 2024)
- 11th Persian Film Festival Australia (1 – 11 May 2025)

== Winners of the Persian Film Festival Australia (PFFA) ==
Year	Film	Director	Nationality	Category	Ref
2012	Please Don't Disturb	Mohsen Abdolvahab	Iran	Feature	
2012	The Silly	Amir Azizi	Iran	Short	
2016	The Salesman	Asghar Farhadi	Iran	Feature	
2016	500 Ounces of Gold	Shahrzad Dadgar	Iran	Short	
2017	Parting	Navid Mahmoudi	Iran	Feature	
2017	Save Me	Mohsen Nabavi	Iran	Short	
2018	Dressage	Pooya Badkoobeh	Iran	Feature	
2018	Heyvan (Animal)	Bahman Ark, Bahram Ark	Iran	Short	
2019	Seven and a Half	Navid Mahmoudi	Iran	Feature	
2019	Shouting at the Wind	Siavash Jamali, Ata Mehrad	Iran	Documentary	
2019	Tattoo	Farhad Delaram	Iran	Short	
2020	Pari	Siamak Etemadi	Greece	Feature	
2020	Exam	Sonia K Haddad	Iran	Short	
2021	Festival cancelled due to the COVID-19 outbreak				
2022	Festival cancelled due to the COVID-19 outbreak				
2023	Opponent	Milad Alami	Sweden	Feature	
2023	I'm Trying to Remember	Pegah Ahangarani	Iran	Short	

== See also ==
- Iranian Film Festival
- Noor Iranian Film Festival
