= Zero Latency (company) =

Technology company that develops free-roam virtual reality systems

Zero Latency VR
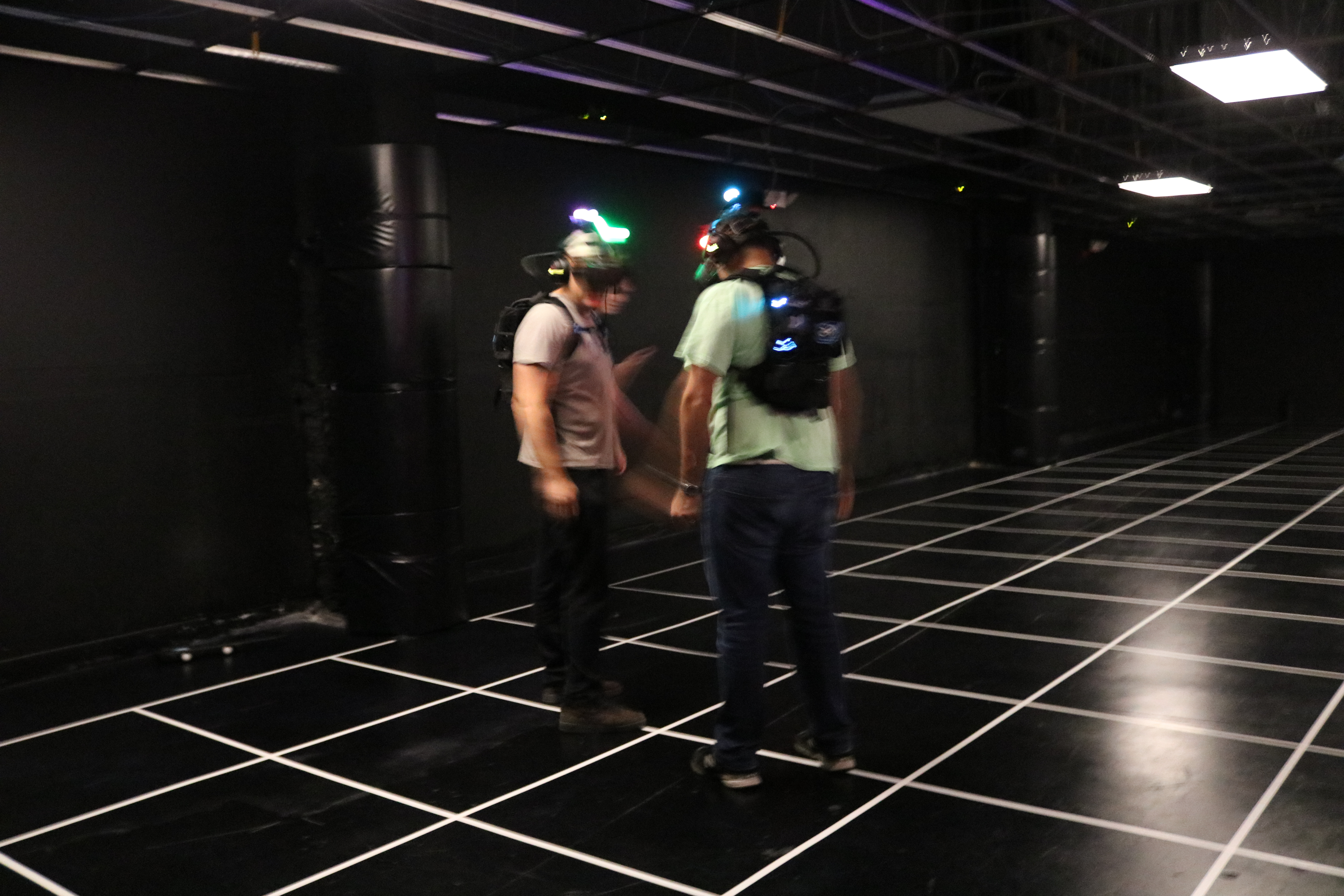
- Zero Latency Virtual Reality Experience, Las Vegas
- Industry: Free Roam Virtual Reality
- Founded: 2013
- Headquarters: Melbourne, Australia
- Number of employees: +100
- Website: zerolatencyvr.com

Zero Latency VR is a technology company that develops free-roam virtual reality systems. It was founded by Tim Ruse, Scott Vandonkelaar, Kyel Smith, who are currently directors of the company, with Dean Dorrell as the chairman.

== History ==
The founders' idea to develop a free-roam virtual reality experience first emerged in 2012 following the success of Oculus Rift's kickstarter campaign, and was initially tested as a single-player game called Inversion VR, in early 2013. A prototype of Zero Latency VR's multiplayer free-roam virtual reality system was first demonstrated to the public at Pausefest, a digital innovation conference, in early 2014. Following this, Zero Latency VR secured almost $30,000 from a crowdfunding campaign, as well as a $60,000 grant from Film Victoria. The company subsequently received $1 million in funding from Carthona Capital, a venture capital firm. In February 2015, Zero Latency VR partnered with Dell's gaming division, Alienware, to provide high-performance computer hardware for use in Zero Latency VR's operations. In August 2015, Zero Latency VR opened a VR entertainment venue in North Melbourne, Australia. This was touted as the first such virtual reality facility to be publicly available.

== Free-roam ==
Free-roam virtual reality allows users to move freely in an open space and not be constrained by cables and other immobile equipment. Perceptual tricks such as "Change Blindness Redirection" are used in free-roam virtual reality to create the illusion of a virtual environment larger than what is physically available. Zero Latency VR employs these perceptual tricks at its 400m^{2} venue in North Melbourne to allow players to travel between 700m and 1 km during a standard game session.

Motion capture technology is used to track the physical location of players, which allows the in-game virtual location of players' avatars to be generated accurately. It took several years to develop the software and hardware allowing players' physical movements to be instantly replicated by their in-game avatars. Proximity sensors are used to warn players of hazards and prevent players from leaving the physical play area.

== Products ==
As of December 2024, Zero Latency VR has 103 venues in 26 countries.

The company also sells its systems to businesses requiring free-roam virtual reality applications. Due to their cost and complexity, Zero Latency VR's systems are not ideal for private use. Instead, they are intended to be used as public virtual gaming spaces or theme park attractions. Zero Latency VR has also partnered with a real estate group to offer virtual house inspections.
