= Nepal Human Rights International Film Festival =

Film festival in Nepal

Nepal Human Rights International Film Festival is an annual film festival in Nepal for feature films. The festival was established in 2010.
