= Andrew Upton =

Australian screenwriter

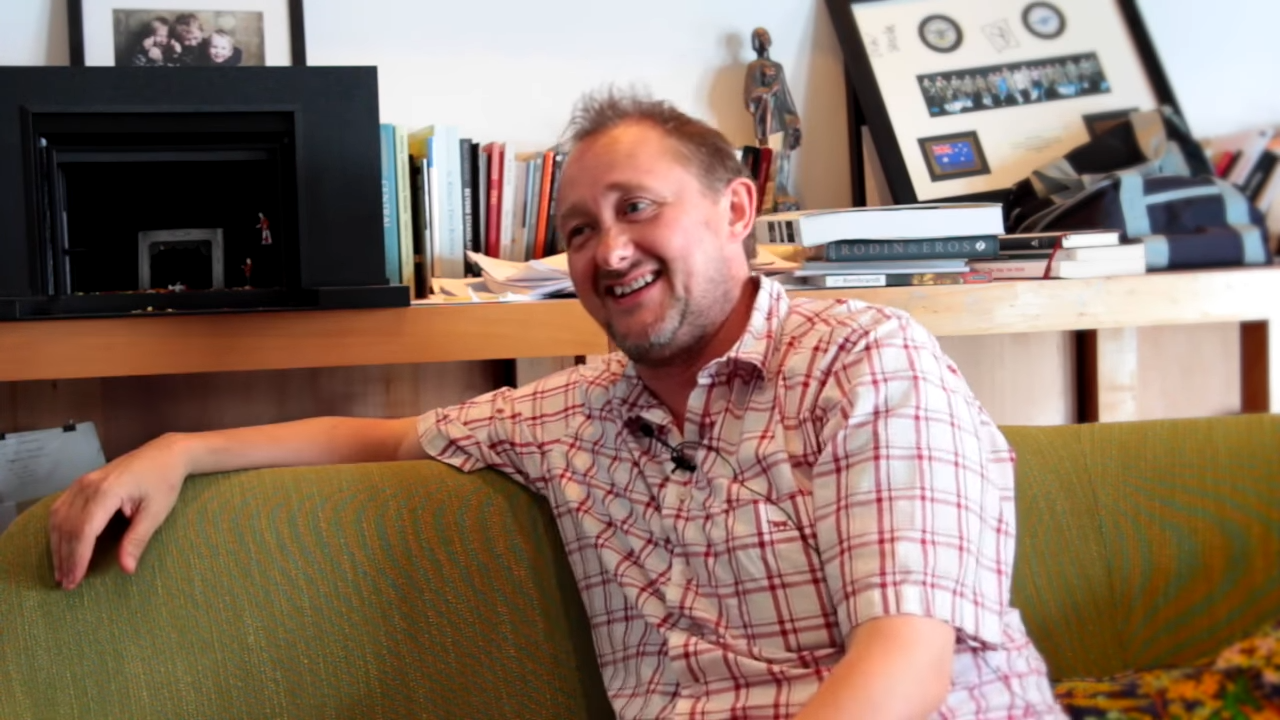
- Upton in 2015
- Born: February 1, 1966 (age 60)
- Occupations: Playwright, screenwriter, producer, director
- Spouse: Cate Blanchett (m. 1997)
- Children: 4

Andrew Upton is an Australian playwright, screenwriter, producer and director. He has adapted the works of Gorky, Chekhov, Ibsen, and others for London's Royal National Theatre and the Sydney Theatre Company. He wrote the original play Riflemind (2007), which premiered at the Sydney Theatre Company to favourable reviews, with Hugo Weaving starring and Philip Seymour Hoffman directing the London production.

Upton and his wife, actor Cate Blanchett, are the co-founders of the film production company Dirty Films, under which Upton served as a producer for the Australian film Little Fish (2005). Upton and Blanchett became joint artistic directors of the Sydney Theatre Company from 2008 until 2012.

== Early life and education ==
Upton attended The King's School, Parramatta, and the University of Sydney.

== Career ==
As a playwright, Upton created adaptations of Hedda Gabler, The Cherry Orchard, Cyrano de Bergerac, Don Juan (with Marion Potts), Uncle Vanya, The Maids, Children of the Sun and Platonov for the Sydney Theatre Company (STC) and Maxim Gorky's The Philistines for the Royal National Theatre in London.

Upton's original play Riflemind opened with Hugo Weaving, playing an ageing rock star planning a comeback, at the Sydney Theatre Company on 5 October 2007, and received a favourable review in Variety. The London production of Riflemind, directed by Philip Seymour Hoffman, opened in 2008, but closed due to the 2008 financial crisis after receiving poor popular press reviews.

In 2008, Upton and wife Cate Blanchett became joint artistic directors of the Sydney Theatre Company for what became a five-year term.

Upton and Blanchett formed a film production company, Dirty Films, whose projects include the films Bangers (1999) and Little Fish (2005). Upton wrote, produced and directed the short, Bangers, which starred Blanchett. Upton shares writing credits for the feature film Gone (2007).

Upton wrote the libretto to Alan John's opera Through the Looking Glass, which premiered with the Victorian Opera in Melbourne in May 2008.

Upton acted in one of Julian Rosenfeldt's thirteen-part art film, Manifesto (2015).

His first novel, Krank Fuss, was published in 2026.

== Awards and recognition ==
In June, 2014, Upton was recognised with the Rotary Professional Excellence Award, an award instituted "to honour a person who has demonstrated consistent professional excellence in his or her chosen vocation by contributing to the benefit of the wider community beyond their typical workplace role".

== Personal life ==
Upton and Blanchett met in Australia in the mid-1990s and married in 1997. The couple have three sons and one daughter, the last adopted in 2015. The couple's children appeared with Upton in segment 11 of the 2015 film Manifesto.

Upton and Blanchett purchased a house in East Sussex, England, in early 2016.
