= Scarygirl (film) =

2023 film by Ricard Cussó

- Theatrical release poster
- Directed by: Ricard Cussó
- Screenplay by: Craig Behenna; Matt Everitt; Les Turner; Polly Watkins
- Based on: Scarygirl by Nathan Jurevicius
- Produced by: Sophie Byrne; Kristen Souvlis; Nadine Bates; Ryan Greaves
- Starring: Jillian Nguyen; Rob Collins; Remy Hii; Tim Minchin; Deborah Mailman; Liv Hewson; Mark Coles Smith; Dylan Alcott; Anna Torv; Sam Neill
- Edited by: Michelle McGilvray
- Music by: Ack Kinmonth
- Production companies: Pink Parrot Media; Alceon Group; Particular Crowd; Like a Photon Creative; Highly Spirited
- Distributed by: Madman Entertainment (Australia); Viva Kids (North America)
- Release date: June 17, 2023
- Running time: 90 minutes
- Country: Australia
- Language: English
- Box office: $1.1 million

Scarygirl is a 2023 Australian 3D animated fantasy adventure film directed by Ricard Cussó and co-directed by Tania Vincent. Based on a graphic novel by author and illustrator Nathan Jurevicius (who was also the production designer of the film) and 2012 game of the same name, the film stars, as voice actors, Anna Torv, Tim Minchin, Deborah Mailman and Sam Neill in the main roles with animation provided by Cosmic Dino Studio.

== Plot ==
Arkie lives with her father Blister, a giant octopus, on the Peninsula. They help plants recover from the loss of electricity that affects them. Meanwhile in the City of Light, Dr. Maybee is precisely using this electricity for his experiments: he also needs octopuses to help him recreate his lost daughter. Chihoohoo and his team, as well as Bunniguru and his Egg, go to Peninsula in search of a giant octopus for which they were promised a reward.

Chihoohoo's team capture Blister for Dr. Maybe as Bunniguru and Egg encounter Arkie. Finding Blister gone, Arkie, Bunniguru and Egg go to the City of Light, where Arkie learns that 12 years ago, Dr Maybee's human daughter - Arkie Maybee - was killed at sea and Dr Maybee blames Blister, whom he experimented on to create present day Arkie.

Chihoohoo's boss, The Keeper, reveals to Arkie her harbouring of several small octopuses, whom Dr. Maybee experimented on prior, telling how Dr. Maybee is now delusional and seeking eugenically perfect appearance at the dying sun's cost.

Arkie confronts Dr. Maybee as The Keeper turns him over to the octopuses. Using the sun crystal and Dr. Maybe's energy beams, Arkie restores the sun whilst Dr. Maybee is rendered partially octopian as penance for his ruthlessness.

== Voice cast ==
- Jillian Nguyen as Arkie
- Rob Collins as Blister
- Remy Hii as Bunniguru
- Tim Minchin as Chihoohoo
- Deborah Mailman as Treedweller
- Liv Hewson as Bug-Eye
- Mark Coles Smith as River Bandit & Swamp Dog
- Dylan Alcott as Rebel King
- Anna Torv as The Keeper
- Sam Neill as Dr Maybee

== Reception ==
The Guardian gave the film 2 stars out of 5 as did The Sydney Morning Herald, stating, that "the finished product seems to have come out back to front, too convoluted for under-5s and too tame for anyone else. The celebrity voice actors convey goodwill rather than conviction, as if reading aloud on Play School: Sam Neill as ruthless scientist Dr Maybee is appropriately sonorous, but not really much of a threat." A review at The Conversation praised visual aspects of the film and its message: "Filled with fantastical world-building, character and creature design, the Scarygirl universe mimics our concern for the natural world and the need for human-nature connection." The film received various awards.
