= Cate Blanchett on screen and stage =

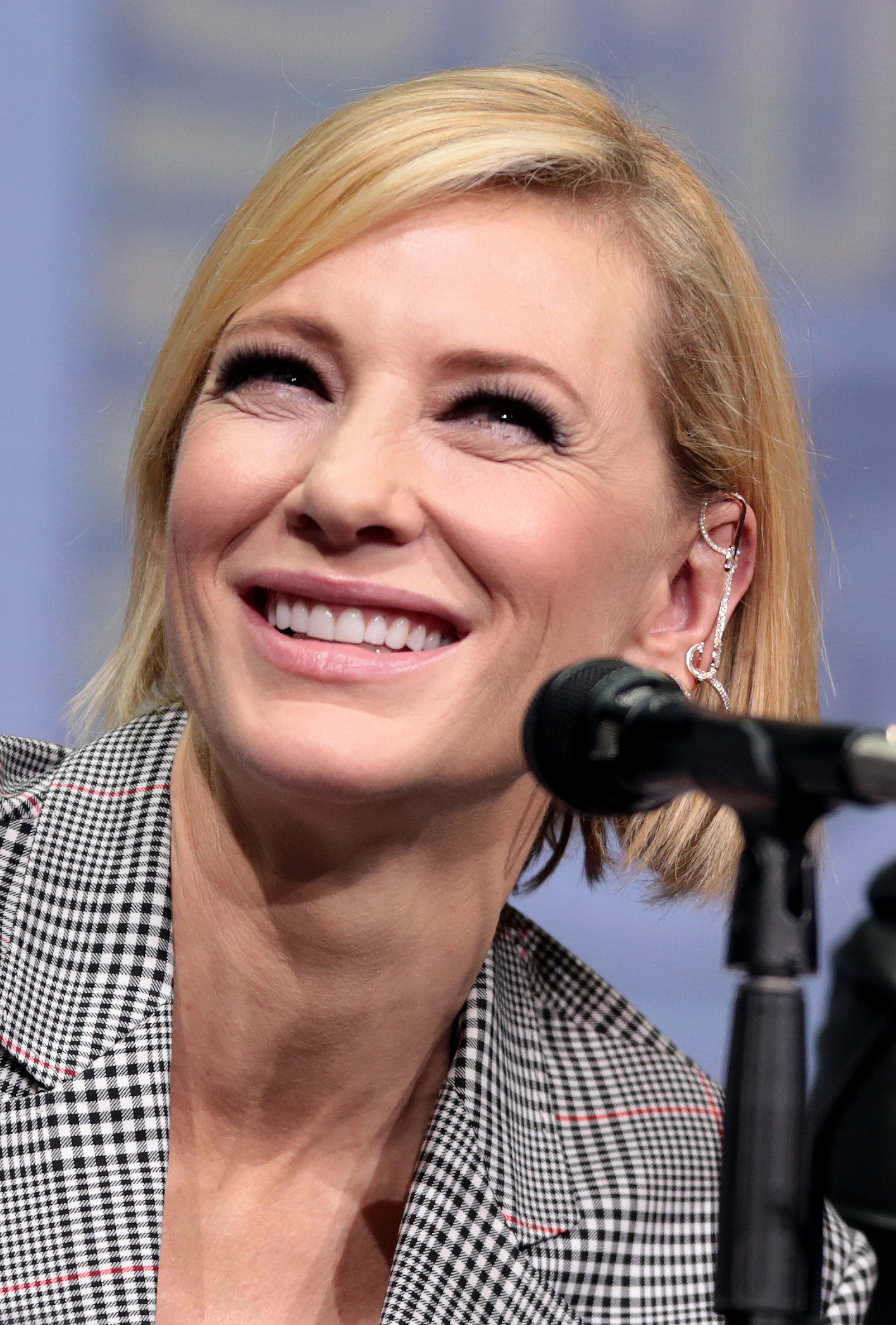
Blanchett at the 2017 San Diego Comic-Con

Cate Blanchett is an Australian actor (Note: Blanchett prefers the term "actor" to "actress".) who has worked extensively on screen and on stage. She made her stage debut in 1992 as Electra in the National Institute of Dramatic Art production of the play of the same name, and followed in 1993 with performances in Timothy Daly's Kafka Dances, for which she won the Sydney Theatre Critics Award for Best Newcomer, and the Sydney Theatre Company stage production of Oleanna, winning Best Actress. She is the first actor to win both awards at once. She went on to perform several other roles on stage, notably Susan Traherne in Plenty (1999), Hedda Gabler in Hedda Gabler (2004), Blanche DuBois in A Streetcar Named Desire (2009), Yelena in Uncle Vanya (2011), and Claire in The Maids (2013).

Blanchett's first leading role on television came with 1994's Heartland, followed by the 1995 miniseries Bordertown. In 1997, she made her feature film debut in a supporting role in the World War II drama Paradise Road. That year, she had her first leading role in Oscar and Lucinda, which earned her a nomination for the AACTA Award for Best Actress in a Leading Role. In 1998, Blanchett received worldwide attention for playing Queen Elizabeth I of England in the acclaimed drama film Elizabeth, for which she won Best Actress at the Golden Globe Awards, the BAFTA Awards, and was nominated for an Academy Award. Elizabeth and her next film, the 1999 thriller The Talented Mr. Ripley, performed well at the box office although her other 1999 releases, the widely praised An Ideal Husband and the largely panned Pushing Tin, were commercially unsuccessful.

Blanchett found success portraying Galadriel in Peter Jackson's epic fantasy trilogy The Lord of the Rings (2001–2003). She won the Academy Award for Best Supporting Actress, among other honors, for portraying Katharine Hepburn in Martin Scorsese's 2004 drama The Aviator, making her the only actor to win an Oscar for portraying another Oscar-winning actor. In 2005, she won the AACTA Award for Best Actress in a Leading Role for the Australian film Little Fish. Blanchett's performance in the 2006 thriller Notes on a Scandal garnered her another Academy Award nomination for Best Supporting Actress. In 2007, she received both Best Actress and Best Supporting Actress Oscar nominations for her roles in Elizabeth: The Golden Age and I'm Not There, becoming one of the few actors to achieve this.

In 2008, Blanchett appeared in Steven Spielberg's action adventure Indiana Jones and the Kingdom of the Crystal Skull and David Fincher's fantasy drama The Curious Case of Benjamin Button. From 2012 to 2014, she reprised her role as Galadriel in The Hobbit trilogy. For her lead performance in Woody Allen's 2013 drama Blue Jasmine, Blanchett won the Golden Globe, the BAFTA Award, the SAG Award, and the Academy Award for Best Actress. She voiced Valka in the 2014 animated fantasy How to Train Your Dragon 2 and its 2019 sequel How to Train Your Dragon: The Hidden World. In 2015, she received praise for playing Lady Tremaine in Disney's live action film Cinderella, Mary Mapes in Truth, and Carol Aird in Todd Haynes's romantic drama Carol. Cinderella was a box office success and Blanchett earned her seventh Oscar nomination for Carol. Blanchett made her Broadway debut in 2017 with The Present, receiving a Tony Award nomination for Best Actress in a Play. She also played primary villain Hela in Thor: Ragnarok. The following year, Blanchett starred in Ocean's 8, the all-women spin-off of the Ocean's trilogy, and Eli Roth's The House with a Clock in Its Walls. In 2020, she created and starred in the ABC television miniseries Stateless and portrayed Phyllis Schlafly in the Hulu miniseries Mrs. America, garnering two Emmy Award nominations for the latter. In 2022, Blanchett received her eighth Oscar nomination for her starring role in Tár.

== Film ==
Key
†	Denotes films that have not yet been released.

Year	Title	Role	Notes	Refs.
1990	Kaboria	American Cheerleader	Egyptian film; extra	
1996	Parklands	Rosie	Short film	
1997	Paradise Road	Susan Macarthy		
1997	Thank God He Met Lizzie	Lizzie		
1997	Oscar and Lucinda	Lucinda Leplastrier		
1998	Elizabeth	Elizabeth I		
1999	An Ideal Husband	Lady Gertrude Chiltern		
1999	Bangers	Julie-Anne	Short film; also producer	
1999	Pushing Tin	Connie Falzone		
1999	Eyes Wide Shut	Mysterious Woman (voice)	Uncredited	
1999	The Talented Mr. Ripley	Meredith Logue		
2000	The Gift	Annabelle "Annie" Wilson		
2000	The Man Who Cried	Lola		
2001	The Shipping News	Petal Quoyle		
2001	Charlotte Gray	Charlotte Gray		
2001	Bandits	Kate Wheeler		
2001	The Lord of the Rings: The Fellowship of the Ring	Galadriel		
2002	The Lord of the Rings: The Two Towers	Galadriel		
2002	Heaven	Philippa		
2003	Coffee and Cigarettes	Herself / Shelly	Blanchett played dual roles.	
2003	Veronica Guerin	Veronica Guerin		
2003	The Missing	Magdalena "Maggie" Gilkeson		
2003	The Lord of the Rings: The Return of the King	Galadriel		
2004	The Life Aquatic with Steve Zissou	Jane Winslett-Richardson		
2004	The Aviator	Katharine Hepburn		
2005	Little Fish	Tracy Heart		
2006	Babel	Susan Jones		
2006	The Good German	Lena Brandt		
2006	Notes on a Scandal	Sheba Hart		
2007	Hot Fuzz	Janine	Uncredited cameo	
2007	In the Company of Actors	Herself	Documentary	
2007	Elizabeth: The Golden Age	Elizabeth I		
2007	I'm Not There	Jude Quinn (Bob Dylan)		
2008	Indiana Jones and the Kingdom of the Crystal Skull	Irina Spalko		
2008	The Curious Case of Benjamin Button	Daisy Fuller		
2008	Ponyo	Gran Mamare (voice)	English dub	
2010	Robin Hood	Lady Marian		
2011	Hanna	Marissa Wiegler		
2012	The Hobbit: An Unexpected Journey	Galadriel		
2012	A Cautionary Tail	Narrator (voice)	Short film	
2013	Girl Rising	Narrator (voice)	Documentary	
2013	Journey to the South Pacific	Narrator (voice)	Documentary	
2013	Blue Jasmine	Jeanette "Jasmine" Francis		
2013	The Turning	Gail Lang		
2013	The Galapagos Affair	Dore Strauch (voice)	Documentary	
2013	The Hobbit: The Desolation of Smaug	Galadriel		
2014	The Monuments Men	Claire Simone		
2014	How to Train Your Dragon 2	Valka (voice)		
2014	The Hobbit: The Battle of the Five Armies	Galadriel		
2015	Knight of Cups	Nancy		
2015	Cinderella	Lady Tremaine		
2015	Carol	Carol Aird	Also executive producer	
2015	Truth	Mary Mapes		
2015	Manifesto	Various	Blanchett played 13 roles.	
2016	Voyage of Time	Narrator (voice)	Documentary	
2017	Red	Mother	Short film	
2017	Song to Song	Amanda		
2017	Thor: Ragnarok	Hela		
2018	Ocean's 8	Lou		
2018	The House with a Clock in Its Walls	Florence Zimmerman		
2018	Mowgli: Legend of the Jungle	Kaa (voice)		
2019	How to Train Your Dragon: The Hidden World	Valka (voice)		
2019	Where'd You Go, Bernadette	Bernadette Fox		
2019	Sweet Tooth	Narrator (voice)	Short film	
2021	Don't Look Up	Brie Evantee		
2021	Nightmare Alley	Dr. Lilith Ritter		
2022	Tár	Lydia Tár	Also executive producer	
2022	Guillermo del Toro's Pinocchio	Spazzatura the Monkey (voice)		
2022	The School for Good and Evil	The Storian (voice)		
2023	The New Boy	Sister Eileen	Also producer	
2023	Euphoria	Tiger (voice)		
2024	Rumours	Hilda Ortmann		
2024	Borderlands	Lilith		
2025	Black Bag	Kathryn St. Jean		
2025	Father Mother Sister Brother	Timothea		
2026	Alpha Gang	Alpha One		
2027	How to Train Your Dragon 2 †	Valka Haddock	Post-production	
TBA	Sweetsick †	Eleanor	Post-production; also producer	
TBA	The Origin of the World †	TBA	Filming	

== Television ==
Year(s)	Title	Role(s)	Notes	Refs.
1993	Police Rescue	Mrs. Haines	Episode: "The Loaded Boy"	
1994	Police Rescue	Vivian	TV movie	
1994	Heartland	Elizabeth Ashton	12 episodes, also known as Burned Bridge	
1994	G.P.	Janie Morris	Episode: "Natural Selection"	
1995	Bordertown	Bianca	10 episodes	
2012	Family Guy	Penelope (voice)	Episode: "Mr. and Mrs. Stewie"	
2012	Family Guy	Queen Elizabeth II (voice)	Episode: "Family Guy Viewer Mail 2"	
2014	Rake	Clarice Greene	3 episodes	
2019, 2022	Documentary Now!	Izabella Barta	Episode: "Waiting for the Artist"	
2019, 2022	Documentary Now!	Alice	Episode: "Two Hairdressers in Bagglyport"	
2020	Stateless	Pat Masters	6 episodes; also co-creator and executive producer	
2020	Mrs. America	Phyllis Schlafly	9 episodes; also executive producer	
2020	The Simpsons	Elaine Wolff (voice)	Episode: "The Way of the Dog"	
2020	Homemade	Narrator (voice)	Episode: "Ride It Out"	
2021	Staged	Cate Blanchett	Episode: "The Loo Recluse"	
2022	Ukraine: Life Under Attack: Dispatches	Narrator (voice)	Documentary; also executive producer	
2023	Black Mirror	Image (cameo)	Episode: "Joan Is Awful"	
2023	What If...?	Hela (voice)	3 episodes (Note: Uncredited for "What If... the Avengers Assembled in 1602?")	
2024	Our Living World	Narrator (voice)	Documentary miniseries	
2024	Disclaimer	Catherine Ravenscroft	Lead role; miniseries; also executive producer	
2024	Taskmaster Australia	Herself, Rhys Nicholson's Hevenly Voice	Episode: "A Bit of a Pickle"	
2025	Squid Game	The Recruiter	Episode: "Humans Are…"	

== Theatre ==
Year	Production	Role(s)	Playwright	Venue	Ref.
1992	Electra	Electra	Sophocles	National Institute of Dramatic Art	
1992	Top Girls	Patient Griselda/Nell/Jeanine	Caryl Churchill	Sydney Theatre Company	
1993	Kafka Dances	Bride/Felice	Timothy Daly	Griffin Theatre Company / Sydney Theatre Company	
1993	Oleanna	Carol	David Mamet	Sydney Theatre Company	
1994	Hamlet	Ophelia	William Shakespeare	Belvoir St Theatre	
1995	Sweet Phoebe	Helen	Michael Gow	Sydney Theatre Company / Warehouse Theatre	
1995	The Tempest	Miranda	William Shakespeare	Belvoir St Theatre	
1995	The Blind Giant is Dancing	Rose Draper	Stephen Sewell	Belvoir St Theatre	
1997	The Seagull	Nina	Anton Chekov	Belvoir St Theatre	
1999	Plenty	Susan Traherne	David Hare	Almeida Theatre / Albery Theatre	
1999	The Vagina Monologues	Performer	Eve Ensler	The Old Vic, V-Day stage reading.	
2004	Hedda Gabler	Hedda Gabler	Henrik Ibsen	Sydney Theatre Company / BAM	
2006−2007	A Kind of Alaska	—N/a	Harold Pinter	Sydney Theatre Company; director only	
2007−2008	Blackbird	—N/a	David Harrower	Sydney Theatre Company; director only	
2008	Blackbird	—N/a	David Harrower	New Zealand Arts Festival / Ruhrfestspiele	
2009	The War of the Roses	Richard II/Lady Anne	William Shakespeare	Sydney Theatre Company / Sydney Festival	
2009	A Streetcar Named Desire	Blanche DuBois	Tennessee Williams	Sydney Theatre Company / Kennedy Center / BAM	
2011	Uncle Vanya	Yelena	Anton Chekov	Sydney Theatre Company	
2011	Uncle Vanya	Yelena	Anton Chekov	Kennedy Center / Lincoln Center Festival	
2011−2012	Gross und Klein	Lotte	Botho Strauss	Sydney Theatre Company / Barbican Centre / Théâtre de la Ville, Vienna Festival / Ruhrfestspiele.	
2013	The Maids	Claire	Jean Genet	Sydney Theatre Company	
2014	The Maids	Claire	Jean Genet	New York City Center's Lincoln Center Festival	
2015	The Present	Anna Petrovna	Anton Chekhov	Sydney Theatre Company	
2017	The Present	Anna Petrovna	Anton Chekhov	Ethel Barrymore Theatre, Broadway	
2019	When We Have Sufficiently Tortured Each Other	Woman	Martin Crimp	Dorfman Theatre, Royal National Theatre	
2025	The Seagull	Arkadina	Anton Chekov	Barbican Theatre, Royal National Theatre	
2026	Electra/Persona	TBA	Benedict Andrews	Lyttelton Theatre, Royal National Theatre	

== Music videos ==
Year	Title	Performer(s)	Refs.
2016	"The Spoils"	Massive Attack	
2023	"The Girl Is Crying In Her Latte"	Sparks	

== See also ==
- List of awards and nominations received by Cate Blanchett
