= List of awards and nominations received by Cate Blanchett =

Cate Blanchett awards and nominations
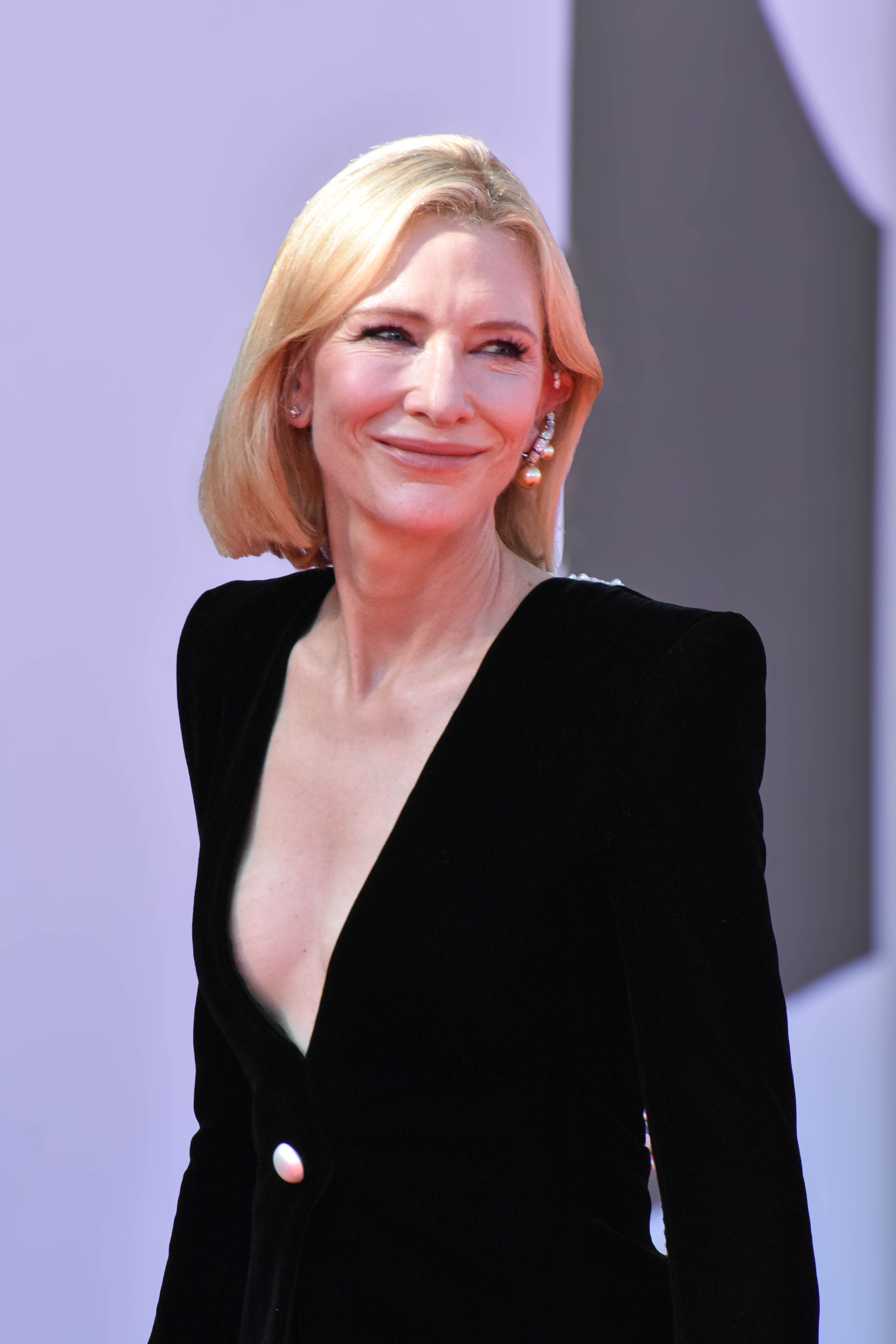
- Blanchett at the 2024 Venice Film Festival
Awards and nominations
Award	Wins	Nominations
Academy Awards	2	8
Actor Awards	3	19
BAFTA Awards	4	8
Critics' Choice Awards	4	17
Emmy Awards	0	2
Golden Globe Awards	4	13
Tony Awards	0	1

Totals (Note: Certain award groups do not simply award one winner. They acknowledge several different recipients, have runners-up, and have third place. Since this is a specific recognition and is different from losing an award, runner-up mentions are considered wins in this award tally. For simplification and to avoid errors, each award in this list has been presumed to have had a prior nomination.)
- Wins: 179
- Nominations: 367

Cate Blanchett is an Australian actor. Known for her diverse roles on stage and screen, she has received numerous accolades including two Academy Awards, four BAFTA Awards, four Critics' Choice Movie Awards, four Golden Globe Awards, three Independent Spirit Awards, three Screen Actors Guild Awards. She was honored with British Film Institute Fellowship in 2015 and an Honorary César in 2022.

Blanchett received two Academy Awards, for Best Supporting Actress for her portrayal of Katharine Hepburn in The Aviator (2004) and for Best Actress for playing a troubled socialite in Blue Jasmine (2013). She was Oscar-nominated for her performances as Queen Elizabeth I in Elizabeth (1998) and Elizabeth: The Golden Age (2007), a young idealistic teacher in Notes on a Scandal (2006), a fictionalized version of Bob Dylan in I'm Not There (2007), a sophisticated woman looking for love in Carol (2015), and a renowned yet flawed conductor in Tár (2022).

She has also received awards from the numerous critics associations including the Los Angeles Film Critics Association, National Board of Review, National Society of Film Critics, New York Film Critics Circle, and Venice Film Festival. Her performance as Katharine Hepburn in The Aviator, made her the only actor to win an Oscar for portraying another Oscar-winning actor. Blanchett is only the third female actor, after Meryl Streep and Jessica Lange, to win Best Actress after winning Best Supporting Actress. She is the only female actor (and one of only six actors) in Academy Award history to be nominated twice for portraying the same role in two films (Elizabeth I in Elizabeth and Elizabeth: The Golden Age) and one of 12 actors to receive two acting nominations in the same year. She is also the only Australian to win two acting Oscars.

Blanchett received Premiere magazine's Icon Award in 2006. the Santa Barbara International Film Festival Modern Master Award in 2008, and was inducted into the Hollywood Walk of Fame with a motion pictures star at 6712 Hollywood Boulevard in 2008. She received Women in Film and Television International's Crystal Award for excellence in the entertainment industry in 2014. She was honoured at the Museum of Modern Art's Film Benefit in 2015, the AACTA Longford Lyell Award in 2015, and the Costume Designers Guild Lacoste Spotlight Award in 2016.

Blanchett was appointed Chevalier of the Order of Arts and Letters by the French Minister of Culture in 2012, and was named a Companion of the Order of Australia in the Queen's Birthday Honours in 2017, for services to the performing arts and as a supporter of humanitarian and environmental causes, which entitles her to use the post-nominal letters "AC" after her name. She was awarded the Centenary Medal for Service to Australian Society by the Australian government. She has been presented with a Doctor of Letters from University of Sydney, University of New South Wales, and Macquarie University, in recognition of her extraordinary contribution to the arts, philanthropy, and the community.

In 2026, Blanchett was awarded the Praemium Imperiale in the category Film/Theatre.

== Major associations ==
=== Academy Awards ===
Year	Category	Nominated work	Result	Ref.
1999	Best Actress	Elizabeth	Nominated	
2005	Best Supporting Actress	The Aviator	Won	
2007	Best Supporting Actress	Notes on a Scandal	Nominated	
2008	Best Supporting Actress	I'm Not There	Nominated	
2008	Best Actress	Elizabeth: The Golden Age	Nominated	
2014	Best Actress	Blue Jasmine	Won	
2016	Best Actress	Carol	Nominated	
2023	Best Actress	Tár	Nominated	

=== Actor Awards ===
Year	Category	Nominated work	Result	Ref.
1999	Outstanding Female Actor in a Leading Role	Elizabeth	Nominated	
2002	Outstanding Female Actor in a Supporting Role	Bandits	Nominated	
2002	Outstanding Cast in a Motion Picture	The Lord of the Rings: The Fellowship of the Ring	Nominated	
2003	Outstanding Cast in a Motion Picture	The Lord of the Rings: The Two Towers	Nominated	
2004	Outstanding Cast in a Motion Picture	The Lord of the Rings: The Return of the King	Won	
2005	Outstanding Female Actor in a Supporting Role	The Aviator	Won	
2005	Outstanding Cast in a Motion Picture	The Aviator	Nominated	
2007	Outstanding Cast in a Motion Picture	Babel	Nominated	
2007	Outstanding Female Actor in a Supporting Role	Notes on a Scandal	Nominated	
2008	Outstanding Female Actor in a Supporting Role	I'm Not There	Nominated	
2008	Outstanding Female Actor in a Leading Role	Elizabeth: The Golden Age	Nominated	
2009	Outstanding Cast in a Motion Picture	The Curious Case of Benjamin Button	Nominated	
2014	Outstanding Female Actor in a Leading Role	Blue Jasmine	Won	
2016	Outstanding Female Actor in a Leading Role	Carol	Nominated	
2021	Outstanding Female Actor in a Miniseries or Television Movie	Mrs. America	Nominated	
2022	Outstanding Female Actor in a Supporting Role	Nightmare Alley	Nominated	
2022	Outstanding Cast in a Motion Picture	Don't Look Up	Nominated	
2023	Outstanding Female Actor in a Leading Role	Tár	Nominated	
2025	Outstanding Female Actor in a Miniseries or Television Movie	Disclaimer	Nominated	

=== BAFTA Awards ===
Year	Category	Nominated work	Result	Ref.
British Academy Film Awards
1999	Best Actress in a Leading Role	Elizabeth	Won	
2000	Best Actress in a Supporting Role	The Talented Mr. Ripley	Nominated	
2005	Best Actress in a Supporting Role	The Aviator	Won	
2008	Best Actress in a Supporting Role	I'm Not There	Nominated	
2008	Best Actress in a Leading Role	Elizabeth: The Golden Age	Nominated	
2014	Best Actress in a Leading Role	Blue Jasmine	Won	
2016	Best Actress in a Leading Role	Carol	Nominated	
2023	Best Actress in a Leading Role	Tár	Won	

=== Critics' Choice Awards ===
Year	Category	Nominated work	Result	Ref.
Critics' Choice Movie Awards
1998	Best Actress	Elizabeth	Won	
2003	Best Acting Ensemble	The cast of The Lord of the Rings: The Return of the King	Won	
2004	Best Acting Ensemble	The cast of The Life Aquatic with Steve Zissou	Nominated	
2004	Best Supporting Actress	The Aviator	Nominated	
2006	Best Supporting Actress	Notes on a Scandal	Nominated	
2006	Best Acting Ensemble	The cast of Babel	Nominated	
2007	Best Supporting Actress	I'm Not There	Nominated	
2007	Best Actress	Elizabeth: The Golden Age	Nominated	
2008	Best Actress	The Curious Case of Benjamin Button	Nominated	
2008	Best Acting Ensemble	The cast of The Curious Case of Benjamin Button	Nominated	
2013	Best Actress	Blue Jasmine	Won	
2015	Best Actress	Carol	Nominated	
2021	Best Acting Ensemble	The cast of Don't Look Up	Nominated	
2022	Best Actress	Tár	Won	
Critics' Choice Television Awards
2021	Best Limited Series (as executive producer)	Mrs. America	Nominated	
2021	Best Actress in a Limited Series	Mrs. America	Nominated	
Critics' Choice Super Awards
2022	Best Actress in a Science Fiction/Fantasy Movie	Don't Look Up	Nominated	

=== Emmy Awards ===
Year	Category	Nominated work	Result	Ref.
Primetime Emmy Awards
2020	Outstanding Limited Series (as Executive Producer)	Mrs. America	Nominated	
2020	Outstanding Lead Actress in a Limited Series or Movie	Mrs. America	Nominated	
2025	Outstanding Lead Actress in a Limited Series or Movie	Disclaimer	Nominated	

=== Golden Globe Awards ===
Year	Category	Nominated work	Result	Ref.
1999	Best Actress in a Motion Picture – Drama	Elizabeth	Won	
2002	Best Actress in a Motion Picture – Musical or Comedy	Bandits	Nominated	
2004	Best Actress in a Motion Picture – Drama	Veronica Guerin	Nominated	
2005	Best Supporting Actress – Motion Picture	The Aviator	Nominated	
2007	Best Supporting Actress – Motion Picture	Notes on a Scandal	Nominated	
2008	Best Supporting Actress – Motion Picture	I'm Not There	Won	
2008	Best Actress in a Motion Picture – Drama	Elizabeth: The Golden Age	Nominated	
2014	Best Actress in a Motion Picture – Drama	Blue Jasmine	Won	
2016	Best Actress in a Motion Picture – Drama	Carol	Nominated	
2020	Best Actress in a Motion Picture – Musical or Comedy	Where'd You Go, Bernadette	Nominated	
2021	Best Actress – Limited Series or Television Film	Mrs. America	Nominated	
2023	Best Actress in a Motion Picture – Drama	Tár	Won	
2025	Best Actress – Limited Series or Television Film	Disclaimer	Nominated	

=== Laurence Olivier Awards ===
Year	Category	Nominated work	Result	Ref.
2026	Best Actress in a Play	The Seagull	Nominated	

=== Tony Awards ===
Year	Category	Nominated work	Result	Ref.
2017	Best Actress in a Play	The Present	Nominated	

== Miscellaneous accolades ==
Organizations	Year (Note: Indicates the year of the ceremony.)	Category	Work	Result	Ref.
AACTA Awards	1997	Best Supporting Actress	Thank God He Met Lizzie	Won	
AACTA Awards	1998	Best Lead Actress	Oscar and Lucinda	Nominated	
AACTA Awards	2005	Best Lead Actress	Little Fish	Won	
AACTA Awards	2005	News Limited Readers' Choice Award		Received	
AACTA Awards	2008	Best International Lead Actress	Elizabeth: The Golden Age	Won	
AACTA Awards	2020	Best Miniseries or Telefeature (as Executive Producer)	Stateless	Won	
AACTA Awards	2020	Best Guest or Supporting Actress – Drama	Stateless	Won	
AACTA International Awards	2014	Best Actress	Blue Jasmine	Won	
AACTA International Awards	2016	Best Actress	Carol	Won	
AACTA International Awards	2021	Best Actress in a Series	Mrs. America	Nominated	
AACTA International Awards	2022	Best Supporting Actress	Don't Look Up	Nominated	
AACTA International Awards	2023	Best Actress	Tár	Won	
AACTA International Awards	2024	Best Actress	The New Boy	Nominated	
AARP Movies for Grownups Awards	2016	Best Grown-Up Love Story	Carol	Nominated	
AARP Movies for Grownups Awards	2021	Best TV Movie/Limited Series	Mrs. America	Nominated	
AARP Movies for Grownups Awards	2021	Best Actress (TV/Streaming)	Mrs. America	Nominated	
AARP Movies for Grownups Awards	2022	Best Supporting Actress	Nightmare Alley	Nominated	
AARP Movies for Grownups Awards	2023	Best Actress	Tár	Nominated	
American Film Institute	2002	Featured Actor of the Year — Female	Bandits	Nominated	
Behind the Voice Actors Award	2013	Best Female in a Television Series (Guest)	Family Guy	Nominated	
Behind the Voice Actors Award	2015	Best Female Lead Vocal Performance in a Feature Film	How to Train Your Dragon 2	Won	
Behind the Voice Actors Award	2015	Best Vocal Ensemble in a Feature Film	The cast of How to Train Your Dragon 2	Nominated	
Blockbuster Entertainment Awards	2000	Favorite Supporting Actress — Suspense	The Talented Mr. Ripley	Nominated	
British Independent Film Awards	2007	Best Supporting Actress	Notes on a Scandal	Nominated	
Canadian Screen Awards	2025	Best Lead Performance in a Comedy Film	Rumours	Won	
Chlotrudis Society for Independent Film	1999	Best Actress	Elizabeth	Won	
Chlotrudis Society for Independent Film	2000	Best Supporting Actress	An Ideal Husband; The Talented Mr. Ripley	Nominated	
Chlotrudis Society for Independent Film	2002	Best Supporting Actress	The Man Who Cried	Nominated	
Chlotrudis Society for Independent Film	2002	Best Supporting Actress (Audience Award)	The Man Who Cried	Won	
Chlotrudis Society for Independent Film	2005	Best Supporting Actress	Coffee and Cigarettes	Nominated	
Chlotrudis Society for Independent Film	2008	Best Supporting Actress	I'm Not There	Won	
Dorian Awards	2014	Film Performance of the Year – Actress	Blue Jasmine	Won	
Dorian Awards	2016	Film Performance of the Year – Actress	Carol	Won	
Dorian Awards	2020	Best TV Performance – Actress	Mrs. America	Nominated	
Dorian Awards	2020	Wilde Wit Award	Mrs. America	Nominated	
Dorian Awards	2023	Film Performance of the Year	Tár	Nominated	
Dorian Awards	2023	Wilde Artist Award	Tár	Nominated	
Drama Desk Award	2017	Outstanding Actress in a Play	The Present	Nominated	
Drama League Award	2017	Distinguished Performance Award	The Present	Nominated	
Empire Awards	1999	Best Newcomer	Elizabeth	Nominated	
Empire Awards	1999	Best Actress	Elizabeth	Won	
Empire Awards	2004	Best Actress	Veronica Guerin	Nominated	
Empire Awards	2005	Best Actress	The Aviator	Nominated	
Empire Awards	2008	Best Actress	Elizabeth: The Golden Age	Nominated	
Empire Awards	2014	Best Actress	Blue Jasmine	Nominated	
Evening Standard Theatre Awards	2012	Best Actress	Big and Small (Groß und klein)	Nominated	
Fangoria Chainsaw Awards	2001	Best Actress	The Gift	Nominated	
Golden Raspberry Awards	2025	Worst Actress	Borderlands	Nominated	
Golden Schmoes Awards	2004	Best Supporting Actress of the Year	The Aviator	Nominated	
Golden Schmoes Awards	2008	Best Actress of the Year	The Curious Case of Benjamin Button	Nominated	
Golden Schmoes Awards	2013	Best Actress of the Year	Blue Jasmine	Runner-up	
Goldene Kamera	2002	Best Actress – International	Heaven	Won	
Gotham Awards	2006	Best Ensemble Cast	The cast of Babel	Won	
Gotham Awards	2013	Best Actress	Blue Jasmine	Nominated	
Gotham Awards	2015	Best Actress	Carol	Nominated	
Gotham Awards	2022	Outstanding Lead Performance	Tár	Nominated	
Guardian Film Awards	2013	Best Actor	Blue Jasmine	Won	
Guardian Film Awards	2013	Best Line of Dialogue	Blue Jasmine	Nominated	
Helen Hayes Awards	2010	Outstanding Lead Actress, Non-Resident Production	A Streetcar Named Desire	Won	
Helen Hayes Awards	2012	Outstanding Lead Actress, Non-Resident Production	Uncle Vanya	Won	
Helpmann Awards	2005	Best Female Actor in a Play	Hedda Gabler	Won	
Helpmann Awards	2009	Best Female Actor in a Play	The War of the Roses Cycle	Nominated	
Helpmann Awards	2011	Best Female Actor in a Play	Uncle Vanya	Won	
Helpmann Awards	2012	Best Female Actor in a Play	Big and Small (Groß und klein)	Won	
Helpmann Awards	2014	Best Female Actor in a Play	The Maids	Won	
Helpmann Awards	2016	Best Female Actor in a Play	The Present	Nominated	
Huading Awards	2023	Best Global Leading Actress	Tár	Nominated	
Huading Awards	2023	Best Global Film Producer	Tár	Nominated	
IF Awards	2005	Best Actress	Little Fish	Won	
IGN Movie Awards	2014	Best Movie Actress	Blue Jasmine	Won	
Independent Spirit Awards	2005	Best Supporting Female	Coffee and Cigarettes	Nominated	
Independent Spirit Awards	2008	Best Supporting Female	I'm Not There	Won	
Independent Spirit Awards	2008	Robert Altman Award	I'm Not There	Won	
Independent Spirit Awards	2014	Best Female Lead	Blue Jasmine	Won	
Independent Spirit Awards	2016	Best Female Lead	Carol	Nominated	
Independent Spirit Awards	2023	Best Lead Performance	Tár	Nominated	
Irish Film & Television Academy Awards	2008	Best International Actress	Elizabeth: The Golden Age	Nominated	
Irish Film & Television Academy Awards	2014	Best International Actress	Blue Jasmine	Nominated	
Irish Film & Television Academy Awards	2016	Best International Actress	Carol	Nominated	
Irish Film & Television Academy Awards	2023	Best International Actress	Tár	Won	
Mo Awards	2004	Female Actor in a Play	Cate Blanchett	Won	
MTV Movie & TV Awards	1999	Best Breakthrough Performance – Female	Elizabeth	Nominated	
Palm Springs International Film Festival	2007	Ensemble Cast Award	The cast of Babel	Won	
Palm Springs International Film Festival	2016	Desert Palm Achievement Award, Actress	Carol; Truth	Won	
Palm Springs International Film Festival	2023	Desert Palm Achievement Award, Actress	Tár	Won	
People's Choice Awards	2009	Favorite Female Action Star	Indiana Jones and the Kingdom of the Crystal Skull	Nominated	
Russian National Movie Awards	2008	Best Foreign Actress	Elizabeth: The Golden Age; Hot Fuzz; Notes on a Scandal	Won	
Russian National Movie Awards	2009	Best Foreign Actress	Indiana Jones and the Kingdom of the Crystal Skull	Nominated	
Russian National Movie Awards	2014	Best Foreign Actress of the Decade	Cate Blanchett	Nominated	
Santa Barbara International Film Festival	2014	Outstanding Performer of the Year Award	Blue Jasmine	Won	
Santa Barbara International Film Festival	2023	Outstanding Performer of the Year Award	Tár	Won	
Satellite Awards	1999	Best Actress in a Motion Picture – Drama	Elizabeth	Won	
Satellite Awards	2000	Best Supporting Actress in a Motion Picture	An Ideal Husband	Nominated	
Satellite Awards	2002	Best Actress in a Motion Picture – Drama	Charlotte Gray	Nominated	
Satellite Awards	2005	Best Supporting Actress in a Motion Picture	The Aviator	Nominated	
Satellite Awards	2007	Best Supporting Actress in a Motion Picture	Notes on a Scandal	Nominated	
Satellite Awards	2008	Best Actress in a Motion Picture	I'm Not There	Nominated	
Satellite Awards	2013	Best Actress in a Motion Picture	Blue Jasmine	Won	
Satellite Awards	2016	Best Actress in a Motion Picture	Carol	Nominated	
Satellite Awards	2021	Best Actress in a Miniseries or TV Film	Mrs. America	Won	
Satellite Awards	2023	Best Actress in a Motion Picture – Drama	Tár	Nominated	
Saturn Award	2001	Best Actress	The Gift	Nominated	
Saturn Award	2004	Best Actress	The Missing	Nominated	
Saturn Award	2007	Best Supporting Actress	Notes on a Scandal	Nominated	
Saturn Award	2009	Best Actress	The Curious Case of Benjamin Button	Nominated	
Saturn Award	2022	Best Actress	Nightmare Alley	Nominated	
Scream Awards	2010	Best Fantasy Actress	Robin Hood	Nominated	
SFX Awards	2008	Best Actress	The Curious Case of Benjamin Button	Nominated	
Sydney Theatre Awards	2009	Best Leading Actress in a Mainstage Production	A Streetcar Named Desire	Won	
Sydney Theatre Awards	2009	Best Leading Actress in a Mainstage Production	The War of the Roses Cycle	Nominated	
Sydney Theatre Awards	2010	Best Supporting Actress in a Mainstage Production	Uncle Vanya	Nominated	
Sydney Theatre Awards	2011	Best Leading Actress in a Mainstage Production	Big and Small (Groß und klein)	Won	
Sydney Theatre Awards	2013	Best Leading Actress in a Mainstage Production	The Maids	Nominated	
Sydney Theatre Awards	2015	Best Leading Actress in a Mainstage Production	The Present	Nominated	
Teen Choice Awards	2008	Choice Movie Villain	Indiana Jones and the Kingdom of the Crystal Skull	Nominated	
Teen Choice Awards	2010	Choice Movie Actress: Action Adventure	Robin Hood	Nominated	
Teen Choice Awards	2018	Choice Movie Villain	Thor: Ragnarok	Nominated	
Venice Film Festival	2007	Volpi Cup for Best Actress	I'm Not There	Won	
Venice Film Festival	2022	Volpi Cup for Best Actress	Tár	Won	
Women's Image Network Awards	2004	Film Actress	The Missing	Won	

== Critics accolades ==
Organizations	Year (Note: Indicates the year of the ceremony.)	Category	Work	Result	Ref.
Alliance of Women Film Journalists	2006	Outstanding Achievement by a Woman in the Film Industry	Babel; The Good German; Notes on a Scandal	Won	
Alliance of Women Film Journalists	2007	Best Supporting Actress	I'm Not There	Nominated	
Alliance of Women Film Journalists	2013	Best Actress	Blue Jasmine	Won	
Alliance of Women Film Journalists	2016	Best Actress	Carol	Nominated	
Alliance of Women Film Journalists	2023	Best Actress	Tár	Nominated	
Austin Film Critics Association	2015	Best Actress	Carol	Nominated	
Austin Film Critics Association	2023	Best Actress	Tár	Nominated	
Boston Society of Film Critics	1998	Best Actress	Elizabeth	Nominated	
Boston Society of Film Critics	2004	Best Supporting Actress	The Aviator	Runner-up	
Boston Society of Film Critics	2004	Best Cast	The Life Aquatic with Steve Zissou	Runner-up	
Boston Society of Film Critics	2007	Best Supporting Actress	I'm Not There	Runner-up	
Boston Society of Film Critics	2007	Best Cast	The cast of I'm Not There	Runner-up	
Boston Society of Film Critics	2013	Best Actress	Blue Jasmine	Won	
Chicago Film Critics Association	1998	Best Actress	Elizabeth	Won	
Chicago Film Critics Association	2006	Best Supporting Actress	Notes on a Scandal	Nominated	
Chicago Film Critics Association	2007	Best Supporting Actress	I'm Not There	Won	
Chicago Film Critics Association	2013	Best Actress	Blue Jasmine	Won	
Chicago Film Critics Association	2015	Best Actress	Carol	Nominated	
Chicago Film Critics Association	2022	Best Actress	Tár	Won	
Dallas–Fort Worth Film Critics Association	1999	Best Actress	Elizabeth	Won	
Dallas–Fort Worth Film Critics Association	2005	Best Supporting Actress	The Aviator	Nominated	
Dallas–Fort Worth Film Critics Association	2006	Best Supporting Actress	Notes on a Scandal	Won	
Dallas–Fort Worth Film Critics Association	2007	Best Supporting Actress	I'm Not There	Runner-up	
Dallas–Fort Worth Film Critics Association	2013	Best Actress	Blue Jasmine	Won	
Dallas–Fort Worth Film Critics Association	2015	Best Actress	Carol	Runner-up	
Dallas–Fort Worth Film Critics Association	2022	Best Actress	Tár	Won	
Detroit Film Critics Society	2007	Best Supporting Actress	I'm Not There	Nominated	
Detroit Film Critics Society	2013	Best Ensemble	The cast of Blue Jasmine	Nominated	
Detroit Film Critics Society	2015	Best Actress	Carol	Nominated	
Dublin Film Critics' Circle	2007	Best Actress	I'm Not There	3rd place	
Dublin Film Critics' Circle	2013	Best Actress	Blue Jasmine	Won	
Film Critics Circle of Australia	1998	Best Supporting Actress	Thank God He Met Lizzie	Won	
Film Critics Circle of Australia	1999	Best Actress	Oscar and Lucinda	Nominated	
Film Critics Circle of Australia	2005	Best Actress	Little Fish	Won	
Florida Film Critics Circle	2002	Best Supporting Actress	The Man Who Cried; The Shipping News; The Lord of the Rings: The Fellowship of the Ring; Bandits	Won	
Florida Film Critics Circle	2006	Best Supporting Actress	Notes on a Scandal	Won	
Florida Film Critics Circle	2013	Best Actress	Blue Jasmine	Won	
Florida Film Critics Circle	2015	Best Actress	Carol	Nominated	
Florida Film Critics Circle	2022	Best Actress	Tár	Won	
Georgia Film Critics Association	2014	Best Actress	Blue Jasmine	Won	
Georgia Film Critics Association	2023	Best Actress	Tár	Nominated	
Hollywood Critics Association	2023	Best Actress	Tár	Nominated	
Houston Film Critics Society	2007	Best Supporting Actress	I'm Not There	Nominated	
Houston Film Critics Society	2008	Best Actress	The Curious Case of Benjamin Button	Nominated	
Houston Film Critics Society	2016	Best Actress	Carol	Nominated	
Houston Film Critics Society	2023	Best Actress	Tár	Won	
Indiana Film Journalists Association	2022	Best Actress	Tar	Won	
IndieWire Critics Poll	2007	Best Supporting Performance	I'm Not There	Won	
IndieWire Critics Poll	2013	Best Lead Performance	Blue Jasmine	3rd place	
IndieWire Critics Poll	2015	Best Lead Performance	Carol	5th place	
IndieWire Critics Poll	2022	Best Lead Performance	Tár	Won	
International Cinephile Society	2014	Best Actress	Blue Jasmine	Nominated	
International Cinephile Society	2016	Best Actress	Carol	Nominated	
International Cinephile Society	2023	Best Actress	Tár	Runner-up	
Iowa Film Critics Acssocation	2023	Best Actress	Tár	Won	
Las Vegas Film Critics Society	1998	Most Promising Actress	Elizabeth	Won	
Las Vegas Film Critics Society	2002	Best Actress	Charlotte Gray	Nominated	
Las Vegas Film Critics Society	2005	Best Supporting Actress	The Aviator; The Life Aquatic with Steve Zissou	Won	
Las Vegas Film Critics Society	2022	Best Actress	Tár	Nominated	
Latino Entertainment Journalists Association	2023	Best Actress	Tár	Nominated	
London Film Critics' Circle	1999	Actress of the Year	Elizabeth	Won	
London Film Critics' Circle	2014	Actress of the Year	Blue Jasmine	Won	
London Film Critics' Circle	2016	Actress of the Year	Carol	Nominated	
London Film Critics' Circle	2023	Actress of the Year	Tár	Won	
Los Angeles Film Critics Association	2004	Best Supporting Actress	Coffee and Cigarettes; The Aviator	Runner-up	
Los Angeles Film Critics Association	2007	Best Supporting Actress	I'm Not There	Runner-up	
Los Angeles Film Critics Association	2013	Best Actress	Blue Jasmine	Won	
Los Angeles Film Critics Association	2022	Best Lead Performance	Tár	Won	
National Board of Review	2001	Best Supporting Actress	The Man Who Cried; The Shipping News; The Lord of the Rings: The Fellowship of the Ring	Won	
National Board of Review	2003	Best Cast	The Lord of the Rings: The Return of the King	Won	
National Society of Film Critics	1999	Best Actress	Elizabeth	Runner-up	
National Society of Film Critics	2005	Best Supporting Actress	The Aviator; Coffee and Cigarettes	Runner-up	
National Society of Film Critics	2008	Best Supporting Actress	I'm Not There	Won	
National Society of Film Critics	2014	Best Actress	Blue Jasmine	Won	
National Society of Film Critics	2023	Best Actress	Tár	Won	
New York Film Critics Circle	2007	Best Supporting Actress	I'm Not There	Runner-up	
New York Film Critics Circle	2013	Best Actress	Blue Jasmine	Won	
New York Film Critics Circle	2022	Best Actress	Tár	Won	
New York Film Critics Online	2007	Best Supporting Actress	I'm Not There	Won	
New York Film Critics Online	2013	Best Actress	Blue Jasmine	Won	
Online Film Critics Society	1999	Best Actress	Elizabeth	Won	
Online Film Critics Society	2003	Best Ensemble	The Lord of the Rings: The Two Towers	Won	
Online Film Critics Society	2005	Best Supporting Actress	The Aviator	Won	
Online Film Critics Society	2007	Best Supporting Actress	Notes on a Scandal	Nominated	
Online Film Critics Society	2008	Best Supporting Actress	I'm Not There	Nominated	
Online Film Critics Society	2013	Best Actress	Blue Jasmine	Won	
Online Film Critics Society	2015	Best Actress	Carol	Won	
Online Film Critics Society	2023	Best Actress	Tár	Nominated	
Phoenix Film Critics Society Awards	2001	Best Actress	The Gift	Nominated	
Phoenix Film Critics Society Awards	2002	Best Acting Ensemble	The Lord of the Rings: The Fellowship of the Ring	Won	
Phoenix Film Critics Society Awards	2003	Best Acting Ensemble	The Lord of the Rings: The Two Towers	Won	
Phoenix Film Critics Society Awards	2004	Best Acting Ensemble	The Lord of the Rings: The Return of the King	Nominated	
Phoenix Film Critics Society Awards	2006	Best Supporting Actress	Notes on a Scandal	Won	
Russian Guild of Film Critics	1999	Best Foreign Actress	Elizabeth	Nominated	
San Diego Film Critics Society	2001	Best Actress	Charlotte Gray	Nominated	
San Diego Film Critics Society	2006	Best Ensemble	The cast of Babel	Won	
San Diego Film Critics Society	2007	Best Supporting Actress	I'm Not There	Runner-up	
San Diego Film Critics Society	2013	Best Actress	Blue Jasmine	Won	
San Diego Film Critics Society	2022	Best Supporting Actress	Nightmare Alley	Nominated	
San Diego Film Critics Society	2023	Best Actress	Tár	Runner-up	
San Francisco Bay Area Film Critics Circle	2013	Best Actress	Blue Jasmine	Won	
San Francisco Bay Area Film Critics Circle	2015	Best Actress	Carol	Nominated	
San Francisco Bay Area Film Critics Circle	2023	Best Actress	Tár	Won	
Seattle Film Critics Society	2023	Best Actress	Tár	Won	
Seattle Film Critics Society	2023	Villain of the Year	Tár	Won	
St. Louis Gateway Film Critics Association	2004	Best Supporting Actress	The Aviator	Won	
St. Louis Gateway Film Critics Association	2006	Best Supporting Actress	Notes on a Scandal	Nominated	
St. Louis Gateway Film Critics Association	2007	Best Supporting Actress	I'm Not There	Nominated	
St. Louis Gateway Film Critics Association	2007	Best Actress	Elizabeth: The Golden Age	Nominated	
St. Louis Gateway Film Critics Association	2008	Best Actress	The Curious Case of Benjamin Button	Nominated	
St. Louis Gateway Film Critics Association	2011	Best Supporting Actress	Hanna	Nominated	
St. Louis Gateway Film Critics Association	2013	Best Actress	Blue Jasmine	Won	
St. Louis Gateway Film Critics Association	2015	Best Actress	Carol	Nominated	
St. Louis Gateway Film Critics Association	2022	Best Actress	Tár	Nominated	
Sydney Theatre Critics Awards	1992	Sydney Theatre Critics Award for Best Actress	Oleanna	Won	
Sydney Theatre Critics Awards	1992	Sydney Theatre Critics Award for Best Newcomer	Kafka Dances	Won	
Television Critics Association Awards	2020	Individual Achievement in Drama	Mrs. America	Nominated	
Toronto Film Critics Association	1998	Best Actress	Elizabeth	Won	
Toronto Film Critics Association	2006	Best Supporting Actress	Notes on a Scandal	Won	
Toronto Film Critics Association	2007	Best Supporting Actress	I'm Not There	Won	
Toronto Film Critics Association	2013	Best Actress	Blue Jasmine	Won	
Toronto Film Critics Association	2015	Best Actress	Carol	Runner-up	
Toronto Film Critics Association	2023	Best Actress	Tár	Won	
UK Film Critics Association	2022	Best Actress	Tár	Nominated	
Vancouver Film Critics Circle	2005	Best Supporting Actress	The Aviator; Coffee and Cigarettes	Nominated	
Vancouver Film Critics Circle	2007	Best Supporting Actress	Notes on a Scandal	Won	
Vancouver Film Critics Circle	2008	Best Supporting Actress	I'm Not There	Nominated	
Vancouver Film Critics Circle	2014	Best Actress	Blue Jasmine	Won	
Vancouver Film Critics Circle	2015	Best Actress	Carol	Nominated	
Vancouver Film Critics Circle	2023	Best Actress	Tár	Nominated	
Village Voice Film Poll	2007	Best Supporting Actress	I'm Not There	Won	
Village Voice Film Poll	2007	Best Actress	I'm Not There	10th place	
Village Voice Film Poll	2013	Best Actress	Blue Jasmine	Runner-up	
Village Voice Film Poll	2015	Best Actress	Carol	5th place	
Washington DC Area Film Critics Association	2003	Best Actress	Veronica Guerin	Nominated	
Washington DC Area Film Critics Association	2004	Best Supporting Actress	The Aviator	Won	
Washington DC Area Film Critics Association	2013	Best Actress	Blue Jasmine	Won	
Washington DC Area Film Critics Association	2015	Best Actress	Carol	Nominated	
Washington DC Area Film Critics Association	2022	Best Actress	Tár	Won	
Women Film Critics Circle	2007	Female's Right to Male Roles in Movies	I'm Not There	Won	
Women Film Critics Circle	2014	Best Animated Female	How to Train Your Dragon 2	Nominated	
Women Film Critics Circle	2015	Worst Screen Mom of the Year Award	Cinderella	Won	
Women Film Critics Circle	2022	Best Actress	Tár	Nominated	

== Honorary awards ==
Awards and nominations received by Cate Blanchett
Organization	Year (Note: Indicates the year of ceremony.)	Category	Result	Ref.
AACTA Awards	2015	Longford Lyell Award	Received	
Britannia Awards	2018	Stanley Kubrick Britannia Award for Excellence in Film	Won	
British Film Institute	2015	BFI Fellowship	Won	
César Awards	2022	Honorary César	Won	
Costume Designers Guild Awards	2016	Spotlight Award	Won	
Deauville American Film Festival	2013	Tribute	Won	
Elle Women in Hollywood Awards	2012	Icon Award	Won	
Goya Awards	2022	International Goya Award	Won	
Film Society at Lincoln Center	2022	Chaplin Award	Won	
New York Film Festival	2013	Career Tribute	Won	
Palm Springs International Film Festival	2007	Career Achievement Award	Won	
Santa Barbara International Film Festival	2008	Modern Master Award	Won	
San Sebastián International Film Festival	2024	Donostia Award	Won	
Telluride Film Festival	2022	Silver Medallion	Won	
Toronto International Film Festival	2024	TIFF Share Her Journey Groundbreaker Award	Won	
Women in Film and Television International	2014	Crystal Awards	Won	
Zurich Film Festival	2019	Golden Icon Award	Won	

== State and academic honours ==
Country or organization	Year	Award or Honor	Ref(s)
Australia	2001	Centenary Medal	
Australia	2017	Order of Australia	
France	2003	Ordre des Arts et des Lettres – Chevalier	
Hollywood Chamber of Commerce	2008	Hollywood Walk of Fame	
Macquarie University	2014	Honorary Doctor of Letters	
Norway	2006	Ibsen Centennial Commemoration Award	
University of New South Wales	2009	Honorary Doctorate of Letters	
University of Sydney	2012	Doctor of Letters (Honoris Causa)	

== See also ==
- Cate Blanchett on screen and stage
- List of Academy Award records
- List of actors with two or more Academy Awards in acting categories
- List of actors nominated for multiple Academy Awards in the same year
- List of actors with more than one Academy Award nomination in the acting categories
- List of actors with Academy Award nominations
- List of stars on the Hollywood Walk of Fame
- List of actors with Hollywood Walk of Fame motion picture stars
