= Cate Blanchett =

Australian actor (born 1969)

Cate Blanchett AC
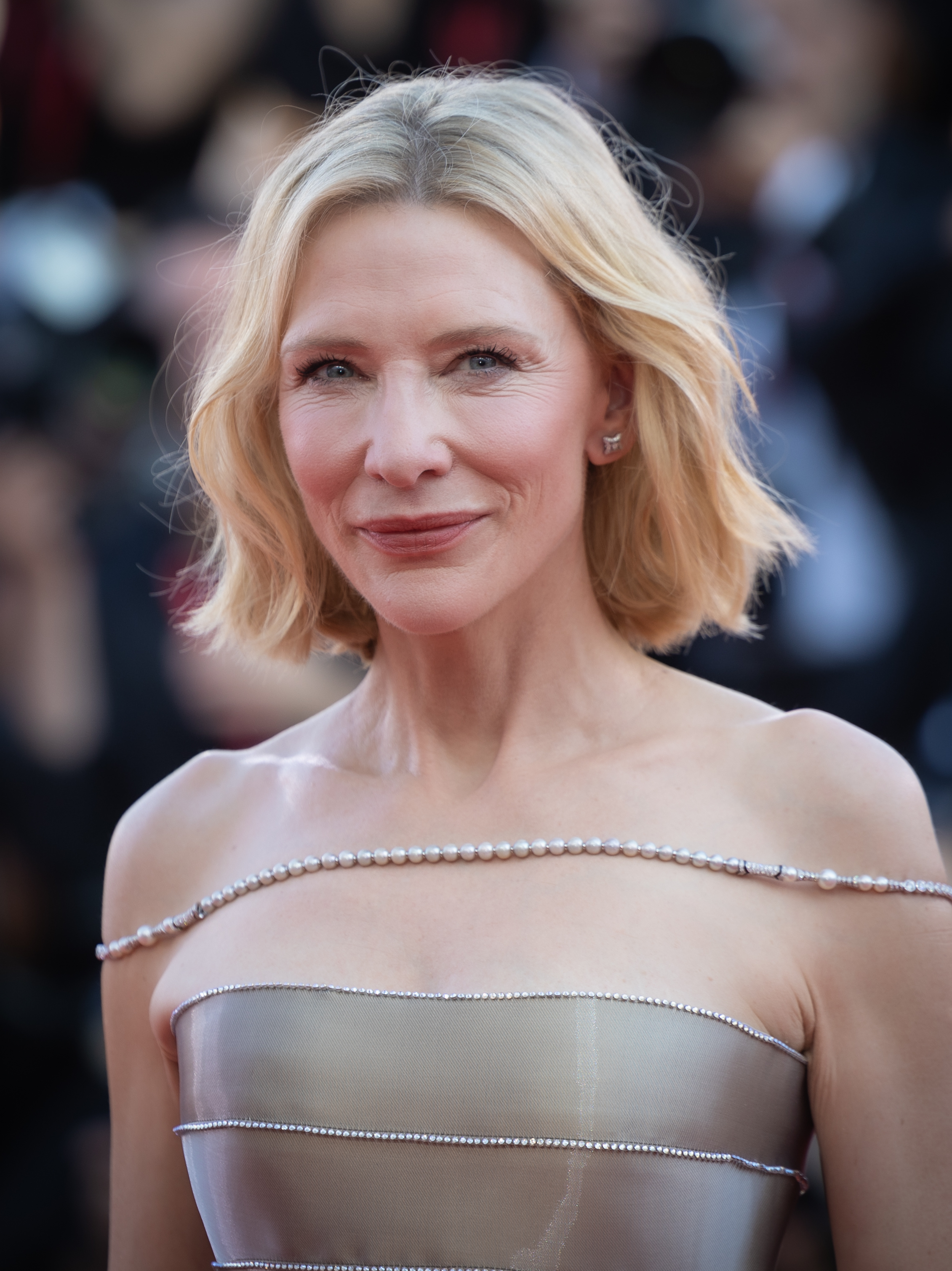
- Blanchett at the 2024 Venice Film Festival
- Born: Catherine Élise Blanchett; 14 May 1969 (age 57); Melbourne, Victoria, Australia
- Citizenship: Australia; US
- Education: National Institute of Dramatic Art (BFA)
- Occupations: Actor; producer
- Years active: 1990–present
- Works: Full list
- Board member of: Sydney Theatre Company
- Spouse: Andrew Upton (m. 1997)
- Children: 4
- Awards: Full list

Catherine Élise Blanchett AC (/ˈblæntʃɪt/ BLAN-chit; born 14 May 1969) is an Australian actor (Note: Blanchett prefers the term "actor" to "actress".) and producer. Regarded as one of the best performers of her generation, she is recognised for her versatile work across stage and screen, including independent films and blockbusters. She has received numerous accolades, including two Academy Awards, three Actor Awards, four BAFTAs, and four Golden Globes, as well as nominations for three Primetime Emmy Awards, a Laurence Olivier Award and a Tony Award.

A graduate of the National Institute of Dramatic Art, Blanchett began her career on the Australian stage in 1992 and made her feature film debut in 1997. She came to international prominence for her performance as Queen Elizabeth I in the period drama Elizabeth (1998), for which she received her first Academy Award nomination. She won the Academy Award for Best Supporting Actress for her portrayal of Katharine Hepburn in the biopic The Aviator (2004), and Best Actress for playing a neurotic former socialite in the comedy-drama Blue Jasmine (2013). Her other Oscar-nominated roles were in Notes on a Scandal (2006), I'm Not There (2007), Elizabeth: The Golden Age (2007), Carol (2015), and Tár (2022), making her the most-nominated Australian. Her biggest commercial successes include The Lord of the Rings trilogy (2001–2003), its prequel The Hobbit trilogy (2012–2014), Indiana Jones and the Kingdom of the Crystal Skull (2008), The Curious Case of Benjamin Button (2008), Cinderella (2015), Thor: Ragnarok (2017), Ocean's 8 (2018), and Don't Look Up (2021).

Blanchett has performed in over twenty stage productions. She and her husband, Andrew Upton, were the artistic directors of the Sydney Theatre Company from 2008 to 2013. Some of her stage roles during this period were in revivals of A Streetcar Named Desire, Uncle Vanya, Big and Little and The Maids. She made her Broadway debut in 2017 in The Present, for which she was nominated for the Tony Award for Best Actress in a Play. She portrayed Phyllis Schlafly in the FX on Hulu miniseries Mrs. America (2020) and a journalist in the Apple TV+ miniseries Disclaimer (2024), both of which earned her nominations for the Primetime Emmy Award for Outstanding Lead Actress in a Limited or Anthology Series or Movie.

Blanchett is the recipient of several honorary awards. The Australian government awarded her the Centenary Medal in 2001, and she was appointed a Companion of the Order of Australia in 2017. In 2012, she was appointed Chevalier of the Order of Arts and Letters by the French government. Blanchett was honoured by the Museum of Modern Art and received the British Film Institute Fellowship in 2015. Time named her one of its 100 most influential people in the world in 2007. In 2018, she was ranked among the world's highest-paid actresses. She also received honorary Doctor of Letters degrees from the University of New South Wales, University of Sydney and Macquarie University.

== Early life and education ==
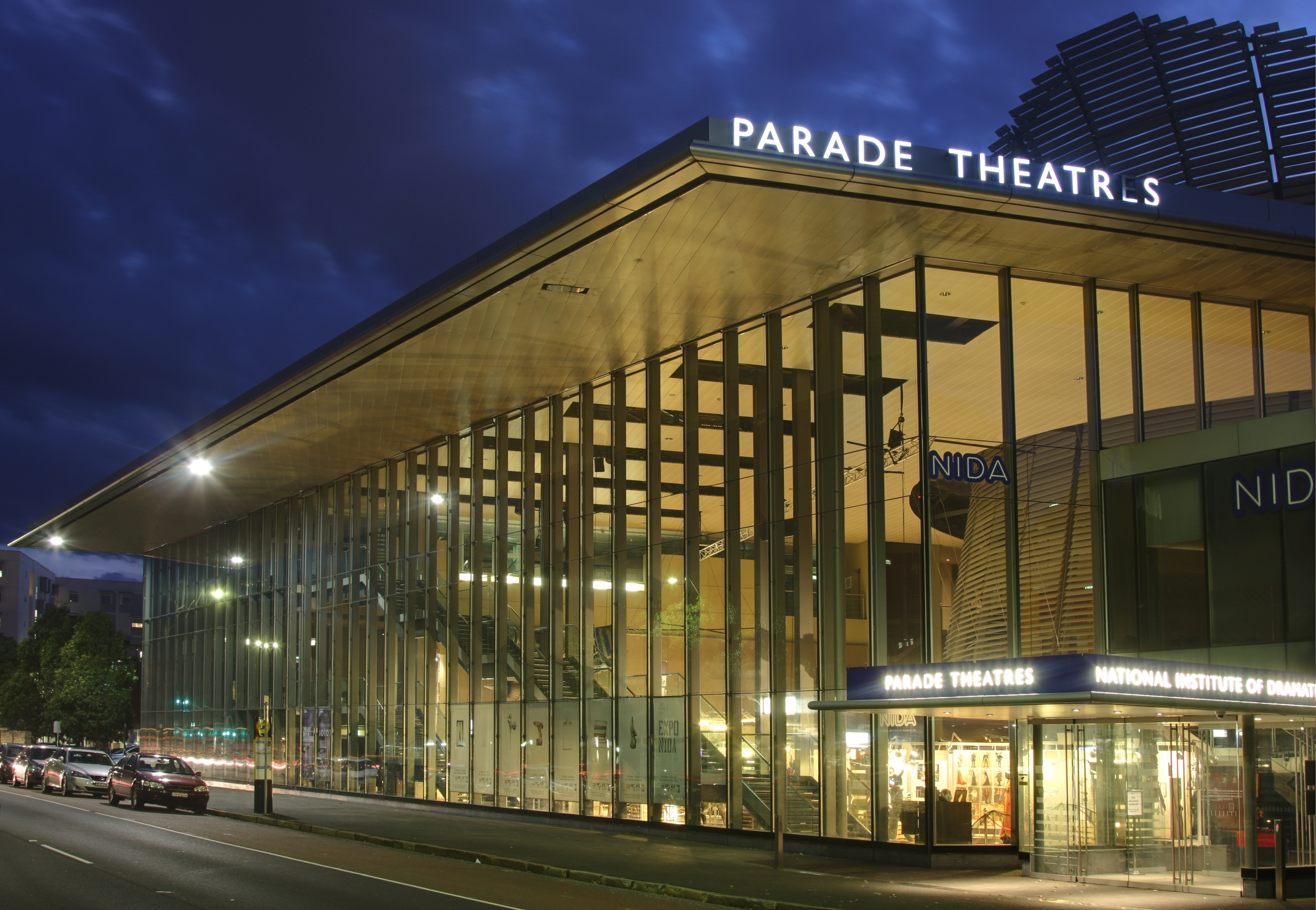
The National Institute of Dramatic Art in Kensington, New South Wales, where Blanchett studied

Catherine Élise Blanchett was born on 14 May 1969 in the Melbourne suburb of Ivanhoe. Her Australian mother, June (née Gamble), was a property developer and teacher; and her American father, Robert DeWitt Blanchett Jr., a Texan native, was a United States Navy chief petty officer who became an advertising executive. They had met when Robert's ship broke down in Melbourne. Blanchett is the middle child of three, with an older brother and younger sister. Her ancestry includes English, some Scottish, and remote French roots. Her father died of a heart attack when she was ten, leaving her mother to raise the family.

Blanchett has described herself as a "part extrovert, part wallflower" child. During her teenage years she had a penchant for dressing in traditionally masculine clothing, and went through goth and punk phases, at one point shaving her head alongside her close friend Imogen Temm. She attended primary school in Melbourne at Ivanhoe East Primary School; for her secondary education, she attended Ivanhoe Girls' Grammar School and then Methodist Ladies' College, where she explored her passion for the performing arts. From her late teens to early twenties, she worked at a nursing home in Victoria. After high school, she began a Bachelor of Arts at the University of Melbourne, where her studies included Fine Arts and Economics and she involved herself in student and independent theatre. Before completing her degree, she decided to pause her studies and travel the world for a year. While staying in Egypt and short on money, a chance meeting with someone in the film industry led her to being cast as an extra as an American cheerleader in the Egyptian boxing film Kaboria (1990). On her return to Australia, she discontinued her degree at Melbourne University, moved to Sydney and enrolled at the National Institute of Dramatic Art (NIDA), graduating in 1992 with a Bachelor of Fine Arts.

== Career ==
=== 1992–2000: Early work and international breakthrough ===
Blanchett's first stage role was opposite Geoffrey Rush in the 1992 David Mamet play Oleanna for the Sydney Theatre Company. That year, she was also cast as Clytemnestra in a production of Sophocles' Electra. A couple of weeks after rehearsals, the actress playing the title role pulled out, and director Lindy Davies cast Blanchett in the role. Her performance as Electra became one of her most acclaimed at NIDA. In 1993, Blanchett was awarded the Sydney Theatre Critics' Best Newcomer Award for her performance in Timothy Daly's Kafka Dances and won Best Actress for her performance in Mamet's Oleanna, making her the first actor to win both categories in the same year. Blanchett played the role of Ophelia in a 1994–1995 Company B production of Hamlet directed by Neil Armfield, starring Rush and Richard Roxburgh, and was nominated for a Green Room Award.

Blanchett's first screen appearance was in the 1994 TV miniseries Heartland opposite Ernie Dingo, and she went on to appear in the miniseries Bordertown (1995) with Hugo Weaving, and in an episode of Police Rescue entitled "The Loaded Boy". She also appeared in the 50-minute drama short film Parklands (1996), which received an Australian Film Institute (AFI) nomination for Best Original Screenplay.

Blanchett made her feature film debut with a supporting role as an Australian nurse captured by the Japanese Army during World War II, in Bruce Beresford's film Paradise Road (1997), which co-starred Glenn Close and Frances McDormand. The film made just over $2 million at the box office on a budget of $19 million and received mixed reviews from critics. Her first leading role came later that year as eccentric heiress Lucinda Leplastrier in Gillian Armstrong's romantic drama Oscar and Lucinda (1997), opposite Ralph Fiennes. Blanchett received wide acclaim for her performance, with Emanuel Levy of Variety declaring, "luminous newcomer Blanchett, in a role originally intended for Judy Davis, is bound to become a major star". She earned her first AFI Award nomination as Best Leading Actress for Oscar and Lucinda. She won the AFI Best Supporting Actress Award in the same year for her starring role as Lizzie in the romantic comedy Thank God He Met Lizzie (1997), co-starring Richard Roxburgh and Frances O'Connor.

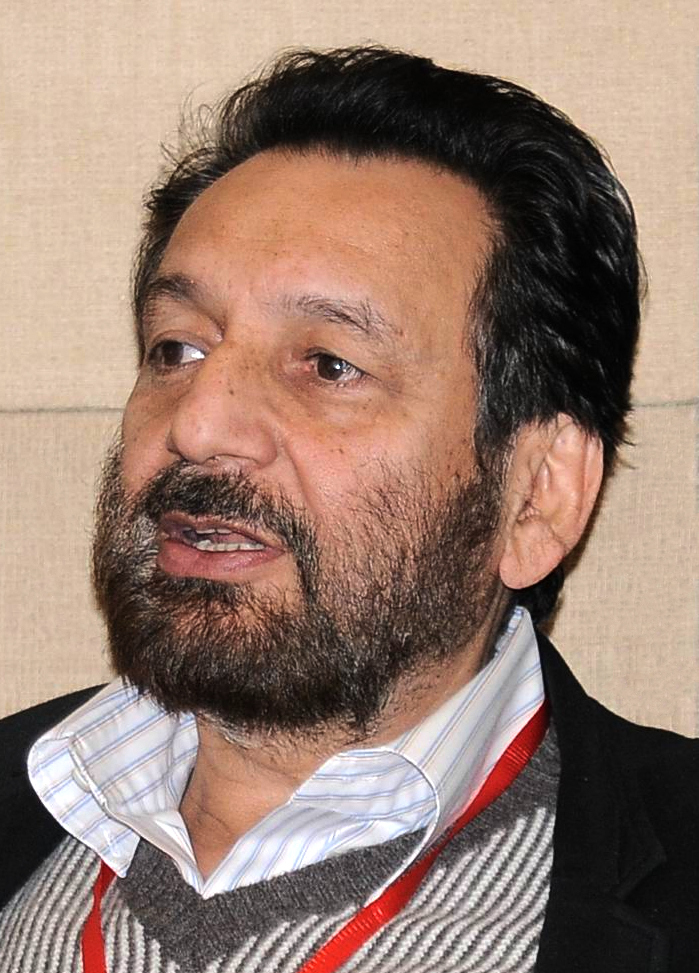
Shekhar Kapur, director of Elizabeth (1998)

Blanchett played a young Elizabeth I in the historical drama Elizabeth (1998), directed by Shekhar Kapur. The film catapulted her to international prominence, winning her the Golden Globe Award and British Academy Award (BAFTA), and her first Actor Award and Academy Award nominations. In his review for Variety, critic David Rooney wrote of her performance, "Blanchett conveys with grace, poise and intelligence that Elizabeth was a wily, decisive, advanced thinker, far too aware of her own exceptional nature to bow to any man. [She] builds the juicy character almost imperceptibly from a smart but wary young woman who may be in over her head into a powerful creature of her own invention." Janet Maslin of The New York Times wrote that Blanchett's performance "brings spirit, beauty and substance to what otherwise might have been turned into a vacuous role", and Alicia Potter writing for the Boston Phoenix stated that, "In the end, Kapur's crown jewel is a tale of twin transformations, that of Elizabeth into one of history's most enigmatic and powerful women, and that of Blanchett into, well, a bona fide screen queen."

The following year, Blanchett appeared in Bangers (1999), an Australian short film and part of Stories of Lost Souls, a compilation of thematically related short stories. The short was written and directed by her husband, Andrew Upton, and produced by Blanchett and Upton. She also appeared in the Mike Newell comedy Pushing Tin (1999), with her performance singled out by critics, and the critically acclaimed and financially successful film The Talented Mr. Ripley (1999), alongside Matt Damon, Gwyneth Paltrow, Jude Law, and Philip Seymour Hoffman. She received her second BAFTA nomination for her performance in that picture as socialite Meredith Logue.

=== 2001–2007: The Lord of the Rings and established actor ===
Blanchett appeared in Peter Jackson's blockbuster trilogy, The Lord of the Rings, playing the role of elf leader Galadriel in all three films. The trilogy was a major critical and financial success, earning $2.981 billion at the box office worldwide, and all three films were later ranked within the top 10 greatest fantasy movies of all time in a poll conducted by American magazine Wired in 2012. In addition to The Lord of the Rings, 2001 also saw Blanchett diversify her portfolio with a range of roles in the dramas Charlotte Gray and The Shipping News and the American crime-comedy Bandits, for which she earned a second Golden Globe and second Actor Award nomination. Bandits marked Blanchett's first notable foray into the comedy genre, with Ben Falk of the BBC declaring her and co-star Billy Bob Thornton "a real find as comedians" and calling her performance as an unsatisfied housewife caught between two escaped convicts "unhinged, though undeniably sexy".

In 2002, Blanchett starred opposite Giovanni Ribisi in Tom Tykwer-directed Heaven, the first film in an unfinished trilogy by writer-director Krzysztof Kieślowski. Her performance in the film as a grieving woman who commits a desperate act of terrorism was highly praised, with Stephen Holden of The New York Times calling it, "the most compelling screen performance of her career" and going on to state, "Although Ms. Blanchett's face has always registered emotion with a mercurial fluidity, the immediacy of feeling she conveys in "Heaven" is astonishing." 2003 saw Blanchett again playing a wide range of roles: Galadriel in the third and final instalment of the Lord of the Rings trilogy (which won 11 Oscars, including Best Picture); the Ron Howard-directed western thriller The Missing; Jim Jarmusch's Coffee and Cigarettes, playing two roles (both against herself), for which she received an Independent Spirit Award for Best Supporting Female nomination; and the biographical Veronica Guerin, which earned her a Golden Globe nomination. In 2004, Blanchett portrayed a pregnant journalist chronicling an underwater voyage by an eccentric oceanographer in Wes Anderson's The Life Aquatic with Steve Zissou.

Blanchett won her first Academy Award for Best Supporting Actress in 2005 for her highly acclaimed portrayal of Katharine Hepburn in Martin Scorsese's The Aviator (2004). This made Blanchett the first actor in history to win an Academy Award for portraying another Academy Award-winning actor. She lent her Oscar statuette to the Australian Centre for the Moving Image. In his review for Newsweek, David Ansen wrote that Blanchett portrayed Hepburn with "lip-smacking vivacity", and Roger Ebert lauded the performance, describing it as "delightful and yet touching; mannered and tomboyish". During her preparation for the role, and at the request of Scorsese, Blanchett reviewed 35-millimeter prints of all of Hepburn's first fifteen screen performances to study and memorise her poise, mannerisms and speech pattern. Blanchett spoke of the responsibility of portraying such an iconic star, stating, "Representing Kate in the same medium, film, in which she existed was very daunting. But because she was so private and few people really knew her, we basically know Hepburn through her films. So of course you have to give a nod to her screen persona when playing her." That year, Blanchett also won the Australian Film Institute Best Actress Award for her performance as Tracy Heart, a former heroin addict, in the Australian film Little Fish (2005), co-produced by her and her husband's production company, Dirty Films. Though lesser known globally than some of her other films, the sober and sensitive Little Fish received great critical acclaim in Blanchett's native Australia and was nominated for 13 Australian Film Institute awards.

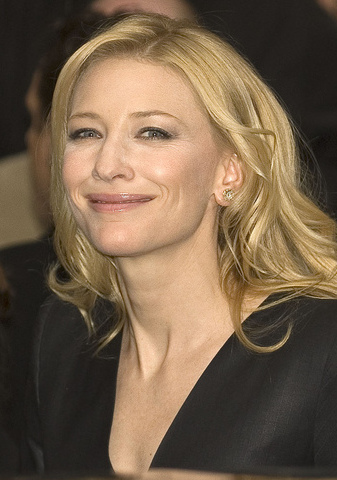
Blanchett attending an event for The Good German at the 2007 Berlin International Film Festival

In 2006, Blanchett portrayed Hedda Gabler at the Brooklyn Academy of Music in the Sydney Theatre Company production of Hedda Gabler, directed by Robyn Nevin. She then starred opposite Brad Pitt in Alejandro González Iñárritu's multi-lingual, multi-narrative drama Babel, as one half of a grieving couple who get caught up in an international incident in Morocco. Babel received seven Academy Award nominations. She also co-starred in Steven Soderbergh's World War II-era drama The Good German with George Clooney, and the psychological thriller Notes on a Scandal opposite Dame Judi Dench. Blanchett received a third Academy Award nomination for her performance in the latter film, where she portrays a lonely teacher who embarks on an affair with a 15-year-old student and becomes the object of obsession for an older woman played by Dench. Both Blanchett's and Dench's performances were highly acclaimed, with Peter Bradshaw writing in The Guardian, "Director Richard Eyre, with unshowy authority, gets the best out of Dench and Blanchett and, with great shrewdness, elicits from these two actors all the little tensions and exasperations – as well as the genuine tenderness – in their tragically fraught relationship."

In 2007, Blanchett was named one of Time magazine's 100 Most Influential People in the World, and appeared on Forbes' Celebrity 100 list. She made a cameo as Janine, forensic scientist and ex-girlfriend of Simon Pegg's character, in Edgar Wright's action comedy film Hot Fuzz (2007). The cameo was uncredited and she gave her fee to charity. She reprised her role as Queen Elizabeth I in the 2007 sequel Elizabeth: The Golden Age directed by Shekhar Kapur, and also portrayed Jude Quinn, one of six incarnations of Bob Dylan in Todd Haynes' experimental film I'm Not There. She won the Volpi Cup for Best Actress at the Venice Film Festival, the Independent Spirit Award, and Golden Globe Award for Best Supporting Actress for her portrayal of Jude Quinn. At the 80th Academy Awards, Blanchett received two nominations – Best Actress for Elizabeth: the Golden Age and Best Supporting Actress for I'm Not There – becoming the first actress to receive a second nomination with the reprisal of a role. Of her achievement that year, Roger Ebert said, "That Blanchett could appear in the same Toronto International Film Festival playing Elizabeth and Bob Dylan, both splendidly, is a wonder of acting."

=== 2008–2011: Directing the Sydney Theatre Company ===
Blanchett next appeared in Steven Spielberg's Indiana Jones and the Kingdom of the Crystal Skull (2008), as the villainous KGB agent Col. Dr. Irina Spalko. The film received mixed reviews from critics and audiences but was a major box office success, grossing over $790 million worldwide. In David Fincher's Oscar-nominated The Curious Case of Benjamin Button, she co-starred with Brad Pitt for a second time, playing the title character's love interest, Daisy Fuller. In the same year, Blanchett voiced the character of Granmamare for the English language version of Hayao Miyazaki's Ponyo, released in July 2008.

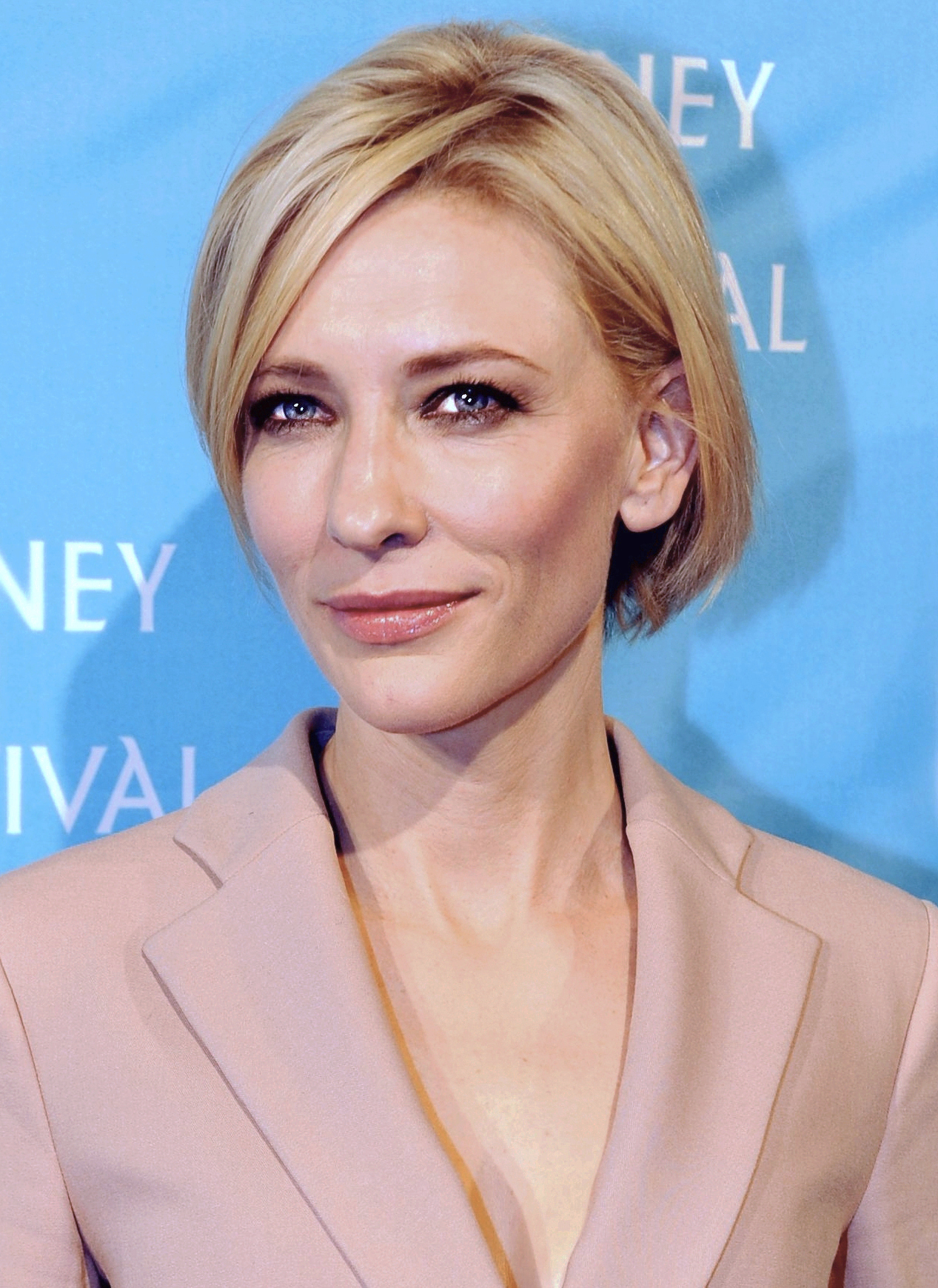
Blanchett at the 2011 Sydney Film Festival

Also in 2008, Blanchett and her husband Andrew Upton became co-CEOs and artistic directors of the Sydney Theatre Company. Blanchett returned to acting in the theatre in 2009 with the Sydney Theatre Company production of Tennessee Williams' A Streetcar Named Desire, directed by Liv Ullmann. She starred as Blanche DuBois alongside Joel Edgerton as Stanley Kowalski. Ullmann and Blanchett had been meaning to collaborate on a project since Ullman's intended film adaptation of A Doll's House fell by the wayside. Blanchett proposed embarking on Streetcar to Ullmann, who jumped at the opportunity after initial discussion.

A Streetcar Named Desire production travelled from Sydney to the Brooklyn Academy of Music in New York, and the Kennedy Center in Washington, D.C. It was a critical and commercial success, and Blanchett received acclaim for her performance as Blanche DuBois. The New York Times critic Ben Brantley said, "Ms. Ullmann and Ms. Blanchett have performed the play as if it had never been staged before, with the result that, as a friend of mine put it, 'you feel like you're hearing words you thought you knew pronounced correctly for the first time.'" John Lahr of The New Yorker wrote of her portrayal, "with her alert mind, her informed heart, and her lithe, patrician silhouette, [Blanchett] gets it right from the first beat... I don't expect to see a better performance of this role in my lifetime." Jane Fonda, who attended a New York show, deemed it "perhaps the greatest stage performance I have ever seen", and Meryl Streep declared, "That performance was as naked, as raw and extraordinary and astonishing and surprising and scary as anything I've ever seen... I thought I'd seen that play, I thought I knew all the lines by heart, because I've seen it so many times, but I'd never seen the play until I saw that performance." Blanchett won the Sydney Theatre Award for Best Actress in a Leading Role. The production and Blanchett received Helen Hayes Awards, for Outstanding Non-Resident Production and Outstanding Lead Actress in a Non-Resident Production award, respectively.

In 2010, Blanchett starred as Lady Marion opposite Russell Crowe's titular hero in Ridley Scott's epic Robin Hood. The film received mixed reviews from critics but was a financial success, earning $321 million at the worldwide box office. In 2011, she played the antagonist CIA agent Marissa Wiegler in Joe Wright's action thriller film Hanna, co-starring with Saoirse Ronan and Eric Bana.

In 2011, Blanchett took part in two Sydney Theatre Company productions. She played Lotte Kotte in a new translation of Botho Strauß's 1978 play Groß und klein (Big and Small) from Martin Crimp, directed by Benedict Andrews. After its Sydney run, the production travelled to London, Paris, the Vienna Festival and Ruhrfestspiele. Blanchett and the production received wide acclaim. Blanchett was nominated for the Evening Standard Theatre Awards for Best Actress, and won the Sydney Theatre Award for Best Actress in a Leading Role and the Helpmann Award for Best Actress. She then played Yelena, opposite Hugo Weaving and Richard Roxburgh, in Andrew Upton's adaptation of Anton Chekhov's Uncle Vanya, which travelled to the Kennedy Center and the New York City Center as part of the Lincoln Center Festival. The production and Blanchett received critical acclaim, with The New York Times' Ben Brantley declaring, "I consider the three hours I spent on Saturday night watching [the characters] complain about how bored they are among the happiest of my theatregoing life ... This Uncle Vanya gets under your skin like no other I have seen ... [Blanchett] confirms her status as one of the best and bravest actresses on the planet." The Washington Post's Peter Marks dubbed the production Washington, D.C.'s top theatrical event of 2011. Blanchett received the Helen Hayes Award for Outstanding Lead Actress in a Non-Resident Production, and the Helpmann Award for Best Actress.

=== 2012–2016: Blue Jasmine and resurgence in Hollywood ===
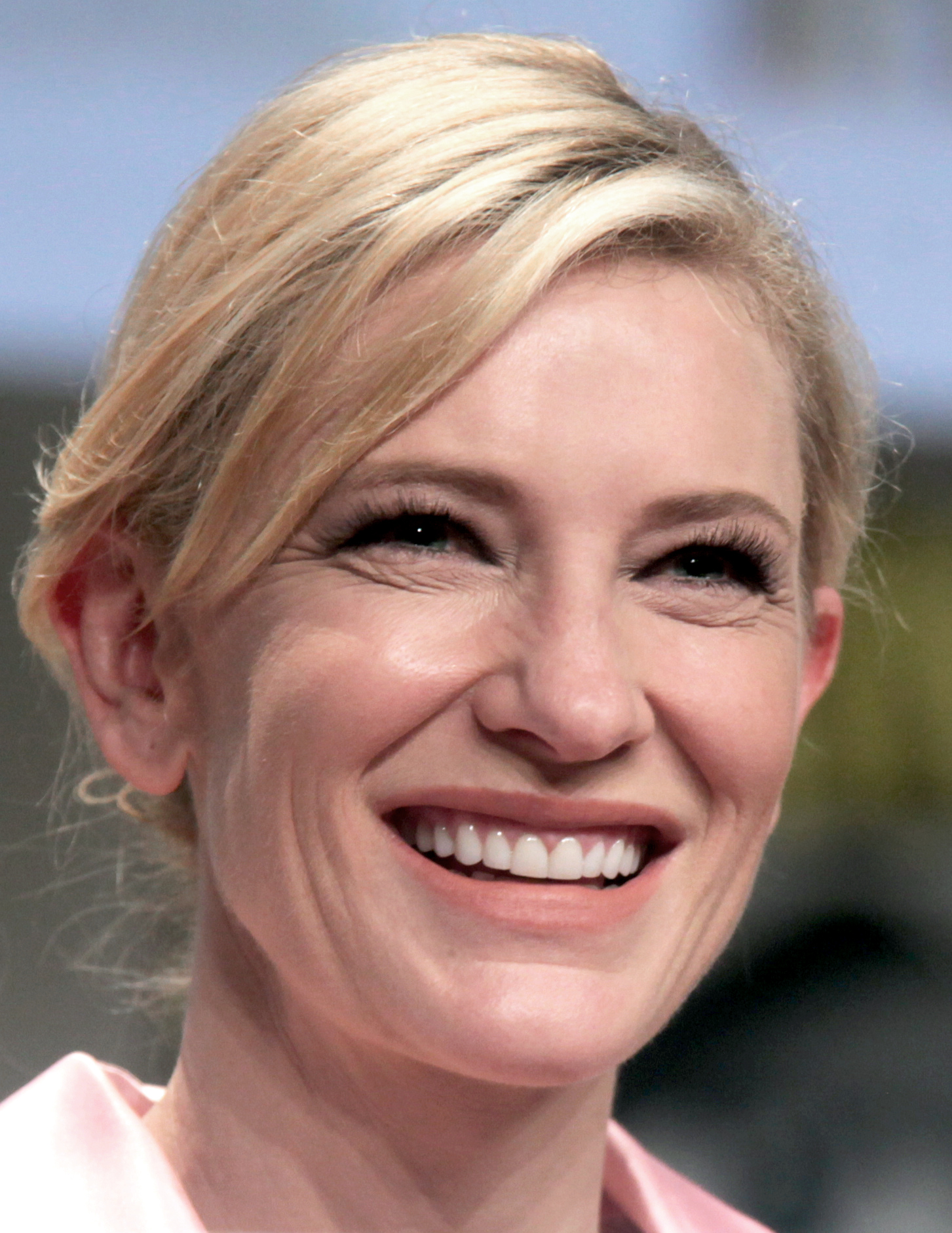
Blanchett promoting The Hobbit: The Battle of Five Armies at the 2014 San Diego Comic-Con

Blanchett reprised her role as Galadriel in Peter Jackson's adaptations of The Hobbit (2012–2014), prequel to The Lord of the Rings series, filmed in New Zealand. While less critically acclaimed than The Lord of the Rings trilogy, The Hobbit trilogy was nonetheless a major box office success, earning nearly $3 billion worldwide. The character of Galadriel does not appear in J.R.R. Tolkien's original novel, but the story was amended by co-writer Guillermo del Toro and director Peter Jackson so that Blanchett could appear in the film trilogy. She voiced the role of "Penelope" in the Family Guy episode "Mr. and Mrs. Stewie", which aired on 29 April 2012, and Queen Elizabeth II in the episode "Family Guy Viewer Mail 2", which aired on 20 May 2012. Blanchett returned to Australian film with her appearance in The Turning (2013), an anthology film based on a collection of short stories by Tim Winton. She was head of jury of the 2012 and 2013 Dubai International Film Festival. The Sydney Theatre Company's 2013 season was Blanchett's final one as co-CEO and artistic director.

In 2013, Blanchett played Jasmine Francis, the lead role in Woody Allen's Blue Jasmine, co-starring Alec Baldwin and Sally Hawkins. Her performance garnered widespread acclaim, with some critics considering it to be the finest of her career to that point (surpassing her performance in Elizabeth). In his review for The Guardian, Mark Kermode proclaimed, "Blanchett takes on the challenge like a peak-fitness runner facing a marathon, ploughing her way through 26 miles of emotional road pounding, with all the ups and downs, strains and tears, stomach turns and heartburns that that entails, a feat that occasionally leaves her (and us) gasping for breath." Peter Travers, reviewing the film for Rolling Stone, called Blanchett's performance, "miraculous", and went on to write, "The sight of Jasmine – lost, alone and unable to conjure magic out of unyielding reality – is devastating. This is Blanchett triumphant, and not to be missed." The performance won her more than 40 industry and critics' awards, including the LAFCA Award, NYFCC Award, NSFC Award, Critics' Choice Award, Santa Barbara International Film Festival Outstanding Performance of the Year Award, Actor Award, Golden Globe Award, BAFTA Award, Independent Spirit Award, and the Academy Award for Best Actress. Blanchett's win made her just the sixth actress to win an Oscar in both of the acting categories, the third to win Best Actress after Best Supporting Actress, and the first Australian to win more than one acting Oscar.

Allen's adopted daughter Dylan Farrow has since criticised Blanchett and other actresses for working with Allen. Blanchett responded, "It's obviously been a long and painful situation for the family and I hope they find some resolution and peace." On the subject of the MeToo movement, Blanchett said she thinks that "social media is fantastic about raising awareness about issues, but it's not the judge and jury" and the cases "need to go into court, so if these abuses have happened, the person is prosecuted, so someone, who is not in the shiny industry that I am, can use that legal precedent to protect themselves. Always, in my industry or any other industry, they're preyed upon because they're vulnerable."

In 2014, Blanchett co-starred with Matt Damon and George Clooney in the latter's ensemble film, The Monuments Men, based on the true story of a crew of art historians and museum curators who recover renowned works of art stolen by Nazis. The French heroine Rose Valland was an inspiration for Blanchett's character of Claire Simone. The Monuments Men received mixed reviews from critics and grossed $155 million at the worldwide box office. That year, Blanchett also voiced the part of Valka in the DreamWorks Animation film How to Train Your Dragon 2. The film received critical acclaim and was a box office success. It went on to win the Golden Globe Award for Best Animated Feature Film and receive a nomination for the Academy Award for Best Animated Feature. Blanchett guest starred on the Australian show Rake, as the onscreen female version of Richard Roxburgh's rogue protagonist, Cleaver. On 29 January 2015, she co-hosted the 4th AACTA Awards with Deborah Mailman.

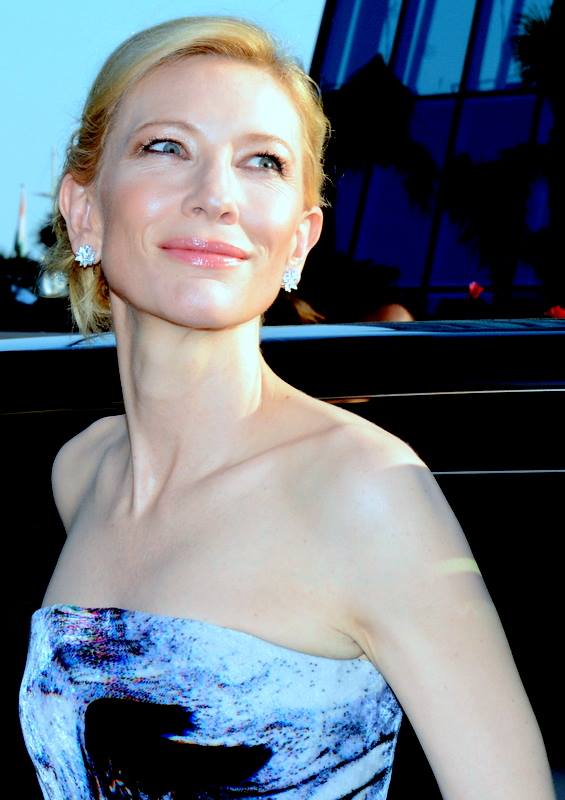
Blanchett attending the premiere of Carol at the 2015 Cannes Film Festival

In 2015, Blanchett starred in five films. She portrayed Nancy in Terrence Malick's Knight Of Cups, which premiered at the Berlin International Film Festival. IndieWire named Blanchett's performance in Knight of Cups one of the fifteen best performances in Terrence Malick films. She starred as the villainous Lady Tremaine in Disney's Kenneth Branagh-directed live-action adaptation of Cinderella to critical acclaim. Richard Corliss of Time declared that "Blanchett [earns top billing], radiating a hauteur that chills as it amuses; the performance is grand without skirting parody." She then starred opposite Rooney Mara in Carol, the film adaptation of Patricia Highsmith's The Price of Salt, reuniting her with director Todd Haynes. Blanchett, who also served as an executive producer of the film, drew rave reviews for her performance as the titular character, which was widely cited as one of the best of her career, alongside Elizabeth and Blue Jasmine. Justin Chang of Variety proclaimed, "As a study in the way beautiful surfaces can simultaneously conceal and expose deeper meanings, [Blanchett's] performance represents an all-too-fitting centerpiece for this magnificently realized movie." For Carol, Blanchett again received Oscar, Golden Globe, and BAFTA Award nominations.

Blanchett portrayed Mary Mapes opposite Robert Redford's Dan Rather in Truth (2015), a film about the Killian documents controversy. Blanchett's production company was a producing partner for the film. She then starred in Manifesto, Julian Rosefeldt's multi-screen video installation, in which 12 artist manifestos are depicted by 13 different characters all played by Blanchett. The project, and Blanchett, received critical acclaim, with Roberta Smith of The New York Times stating: "If the art world gave out Oscars, Cate Blanchett should win for her tour de force of starring roles in 'Manifesto'". In 2016, Blanchett narrated one of two versions of Terence Malick's documentary on Earth and the universe, Voyage of Time, which had its world premiere at the 73rd Venice Film Festival.

=== 2017–2020: Broadway debut and television success ===
Blanchett starred in the Sydney Theatre Company play The Present, Andrew Upton's adaptation of Anton Chekhov's play Platonov, directed by John Crowley. The production debuted in Sydney in 2015, to critical acclaim, and transferred to Broadway in 2017, marking Blanchett's Broadway debut. Blanchett's performance during the play's Broadway run received acclaim. Ben Brantley of The New York Times remarked that "Blanchett knows how to hold a stage and, if necessary, hijack it ... Such commanding, try-anything charisma is useful if you're attempting to hold together a badly assembled party or, for that matter, play." For her work, Blanchett received a Tony Award nomination for Best Actress in a Play, a Drama Desk Award nomination, and a Drama League Award nomination for the Distinguished Performance Award. In 2017, Blanchett also appeared in Terrence Malick's Song to Song, shot back-to-back with Knight of Cups in 2012, and portrayed the goddess of death Hela in the Marvel Studios film Thor: Ragnarok, directed by Taika Waititi. Thor: Ragnarok was both a critical and financial success, earning $854 million at the worldwide box office.

In 2018, Blanchett starred in Ocean's 8, the all-female spin-off of the Ocean's Eleven franchise, directed by Gary Ross, opposite Sandra Bullock, Anne Hathaway, Sarah Paulson, Mindy Kaling, Helena Bonham Carter, Rihanna and Awkwafina. The film garnered mainly mixed reviews but was a box office success, earning over $297 million worldwide. She also portrayed Florence Zimmerman in the film adaptation of The House with a Clock in Its Walls directed by Eli Roth and narrated Shannon Ashlyn's award-winning Australian historical fantasy film Sweet Tooth. Blanchett was appointed the president of the jury of the 71st Cannes Film Festival, which took place in May 2018. That year, Forbes listed her as one of world's highest-paid actresses with annual earnings of $12.5 million.

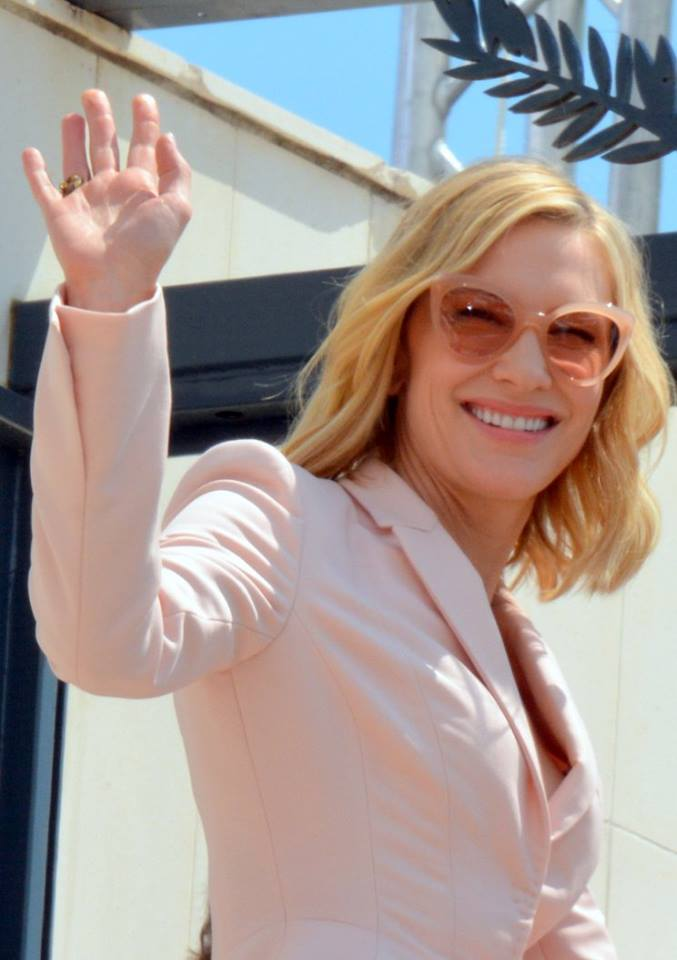
Blanchett at the 2018 Cannes Film Festival, where she served as jury president

Blanchett portrayed a female version of the python Kaa in Andy Serkis' adaptation of The Jungle Book titled Mowgli: Legend of the Jungle (2018). Serkis utilised a mixture of motion capture, CG animation and live-action in the film, and the role of Kaa was written to be much closer to the original character in the short stories by the author Rudyard Kipling, which is as a mentor-like figure for Mowgli. The film was released on Netflix in 2019. In the same year, Blanchett starred in Where'd You Go, Bernadette, an adaptation of the best-selling book of the same name, which was directed by Richard Linklater. The film received mostly mixed reviews and made $10.4 million at the box office against a budget of $18 million, but Blanchett's performance as the titular character received praise, with Pete Hammond writing in his review for Deadline, "[The film] doesn't quite measure up to expectations, despite a game performance from the incandescent Cate Blanchett, who clearly is the best reason to see this movie." She received her tenth Golden Globe nomination for her performance in the film. Also that year, she reprised her role as Valka in How to Train Your Dragon: The Hidden World, which was nominated for Best Animated Feature at the 92nd Academy Awards.

In 2020, Blanchett's Dirty Films production company was signed with New Republic Pictures for feature films and FX Networks for television. Blanchett returned to television by starring in two miniseries. She played a supporting role in the Australian drama series Stateless, inspired by the controversial mandatory detention case of Cornelia Rau. Stateless was funded by Screen Australia and Blanchett also served as co-creator and executive producer for the series. It aired on the Australian public broadcaster ABC, and premiered internationally on Netflix. Blanchett won two awards at the 10th AACTA Awards for Stateless: Best Guest or Supporting Actress for her performance, and Best Mini-Series for her role as executive producer.

Blanchett also headlined and produced the FX/Hulu historical drama miniseries Mrs. America (2020), starring as conservative activist Phyllis Schlafly. The nine-part series aired to widespread critical acclaim, with James Poniewozik writing in his review for The New York Times, "Her final scene, wordless and devastating, might as well end with Blanchett being handed an Emmy onscreen"; and Michael Idato for The Sydney Morning Herald proclaiming, "Blanchett's track record speaks for itself, but here something else is happening. Every time Blanchett's Schlafly glides perfectly into the frame, there is simply nowhere else to look." At the 72nd Primetime Emmy Awards, she received nominations for Outstanding Lead Actress in a Limited Series or Movie and Outstanding Limited Series, as well as nominations for the Golden Globe Award, the Actor Award (both for her performance), and the Television Critics Association Award for Individual Achievement in Drama. Blanchett also served as an executive producer on the Greek film Apples (2020), directed by Christos Nikou. The film premiered at the Venice International Film Festival to critical praise, and was selected to be the country's submission to the Academy Awards as their Best Foreign Language Film.

=== 2021–present: Tár and further acclaim ===
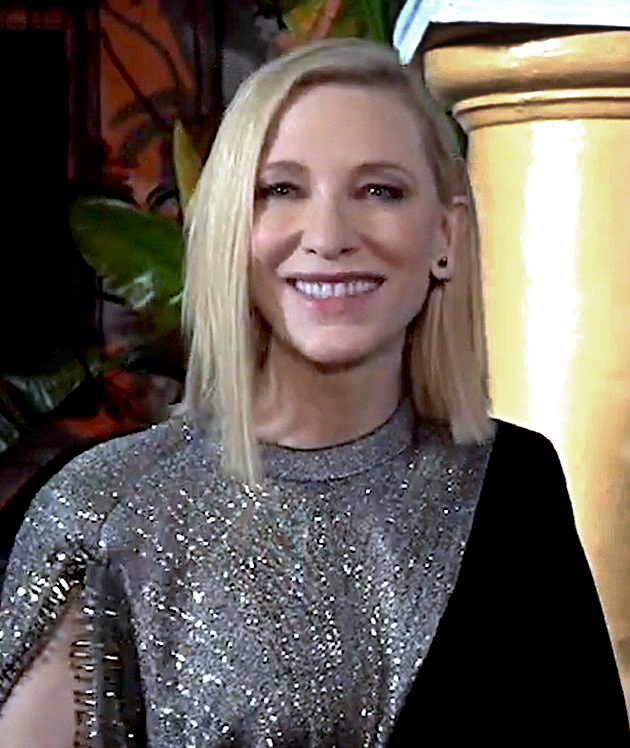
Blanchett at SBIFF 2023

In 2021, Blanchett starred alongside Bradley Cooper in Guillermo del Toro's film adaptation of Nightmare Alley, which was released to positive reviews. David Ehrlich of IndieWire praised the chemistry between the two leads writing, "It's such a thrill to watch Blanchett spar with Cooper". The film was nominated for four Academy Awards including Best Picture. She also acted alongside Jennifer Lawrence and Leonardo DiCaprio in Adam McKay's Don't Look Up, an apocalyptic political satire black comedy film for Netflix. Pete Hammond of The Hollywood Reporter wrote, "Blanchett is having a ball as your typical entertainment-oriented blonde anchorwoman". The film also received an Oscar nomination for Best Picture. With Nightmare Alley and Don't Look Up's Best Picture Oscar nominations, Blanchett broke the record held by actress Olivia de Havilland of being the female actor with the most credited roles in Best Picture nominees.

In 2022, Blanchett starred in Todd Field's Tár. Her performance as Lydia Tár, a fictional renowned conductor, received widespread critical acclaim. The Hollywood Reporter's David Rooney wrote that Blanchett gives an "astonishing performance — flinty, commandingly self-possessed and ever so slowly splintering under pressure", adding that it "marks yet another career peak for Blanchett – many are likely to argue her greatest". For her performance, she won her second Volpi Cup for Best Actress, fourth Golden Globe Award, and fourth BAFTA Award. She also swept the major critics awards trifecta (NYFCC, LAFCA, NSFC) for the second time and went on to receive her eighth Oscar nomination, tying for the fourth most Oscar-nominated actress. That year, Blanchett also voiced Spazzatura in the Netflix film adaptation Pinocchio, reuniting her with del Toro.

In 2023, Blanchett co-starred in the Australian drama film The New Boy, and reprised the role of Hela in the season two episode "What If... Hela Found the Ten Rings?" of the Marvel series What If...?. She also co-produced the Apple TV+ science fiction romantic drama film Fingernails. The following year, Blanchett reunited with Eli Roth to portray Lilith in the Borderlands, a live action film adaptation of the video games of the same name. The film premiered to negative reviews from critics and became a box-office bomb. She then headlined the Apple TV+ psychological thriller miniseries Disclaimer, written and directed by Alfonso Cuarón, and co-starring Kevin Kline, Sacha Baron Cohen and Louis Partridge. It premiered in October to a mostly positive critical reception. In July 2024, she joined the short film Marion as an executive producer.

In 2025, from March to April, Blanchett starred opposite Tom Burke, Emma Corrin, and Kodi Smit-McPhee in a reimagining of the Anton Chekov play The Seagull at the Barbican Theater in London. She also starred in two films, Steven Soderbergh's spy thriller Black Bag and Jim Jarmusch's comedy-drama anthology Father Mother Sister Brother, both of which received critical praise. Father Mother Sister Brother was awarded the Golden Lion at the 2025 Venice Film Festival. Blanchett made a surprise cameo appearance in the final episode of Squid Game Season 3.

She will next star in the sci-fi comedy Alpha Gang, and produce and star in A Manual for Cleaning Women, based on Lucia Berlin's 43-part collection of short stories. In January 2026, it was announced that Blanchett would be reprising the role of Valka in Universal's live-action remake of How to Train Your Dragon 2. In February 2026, her Dirty Films company had signed a first-look deal with Searchlight Pictures. Blanchett is set to star in Benedict Andrews' new play Electra/Persona at the Royal National Theatre from August to October 2026. In April 2026, it was announced that Blanchett will produce and star in Good Thing, a biographical film about Martha Stewart.

== Reception and style ==
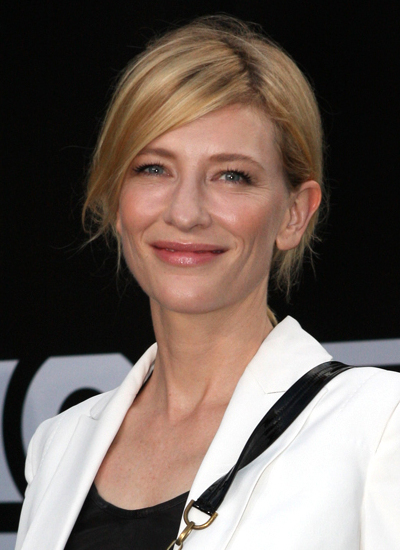
Blanchett at the 2012 Tropfest in Sydney, Australia

Blanchett is regarded as one of the finest and most versatile actors of her generation. (Note: Attributed to these references:) She is noted for her ability to play characters from many different walks of life, and for headlining and being an ensemble player in a wide range of film genres and production scales, from low-budget independent films to high-profile blockbusters. She has also been praised for her mastery of many diverse accents, including English, Irish, French, and various regional American accents. In a 2022 readers' poll by Empire magazine, Blanchett was voted one of the 50 greatest actors of all time.

The Independent stated that Blanchett's "breadth of talent allows her to forge one memorable character after another", describing her as a "subtle and intelligent" actor who is "blessed with a charisma that allows her to step with ease into blockbuster territory." Vulture writers Will Leitch and Tim Grierson regarded her "ability to combine relatability and elusiveness" while being "completely present and yet just out of grasp", and deemed her "the rare actor who can headline anything, from weepy dramas to action films to experimental art pieces to silly comedies." Blanchett's performance in the film Carol (2015) was ranked by IndieWire as the second-best film performance of the decade. Christian Zilko wrote, "The greatest performance in a career where almost every role feels like a legitimate contender, Cate Blanchett's take on Carol Aird is a veritable symphony of repressive silence."

Blanchett has been cited in the press as being a style icon and has frequently topped lists of the best dressed women in the world. In 2004, Blanchett was named the third most naturally beautiful woman of all time by a panel of beauty and fashion editors, make-up artists, model agencies and photographers, behind Audrey Hepburn and Liv Tyler. She was in Empire's list of the "100 Sexiest Movie Stars of All-Time" in 2007 and 2013. In 2022, she was named in The Hollywood Reporter's listing of "Women in Entertainment Power 100".

In 2006, a portrait of Blanchett and her family painted by McLean Edwards was a finalist for the Art Gallery of New South Wales' Archibald Prize. Another portrait of Blanchett was a finalist for the Archibald Prize in 2014. Blanchett appeared in a series of commemorative postage stamps called Australian Legends in 2009, in recognition of the outstanding contribution made to Australian entertainment and culture. In 2015, Madame Tussauds Hollywood unveiled a wax statue of Blanchett draped in a recreation of the yellow Valentino dress she wore to the 77th Academy Awards in 2005. In 2019, Blanchett was among the "10 inspirational women honored with a larger-than-life bronze sculpture" as part of the Statues for Equality project, which "aims to balance gender representation in public art and honor women's contributions to society". The bronze statues were unveiled on Women's Equality Day: 26 August 2019 on Avenue of the Americas in New York City. Blanchett's statue is "a creation based on a single image from the 2003 photoshoot by Matt Jones for Movieline's Hollywood Life magazine."

== Activism ==
=== Environmental ===
Blanchett has been a long term proponent of individual and collective action on climate change and other environmental issues. In 2006, she joined former US Vice-president Al Gore's Climate Project. In 2007, Blanchett became the ambassador for the Australian Conservation Foundation. She was made an honorary life member of the Australian Conservation Foundation in 2012, in recognition of her support for environmental issues. At the beginning of 2011, Blanchett lent her support for a carbon tax. She received some criticism for this, particularly from conservatives. Blanchett is a patron of the international development charity SolarAid, which works to create a sustainable market for solar lights in Africa.

From 2008 to 2011, the Sydney Theatre Company under the leadership of Blanchett and her husband Andrew Upton, initiated a comprehensive large scale environmental program called Greening the Wharf, which invested in solar energy, rainwater harvesting, energy efficiency measures and best practice waste management. The program won a Green Globe Award which was accepted by Blanchett and Upton.

In January 2014, Blanchett took part in the Green Carpet Challenge, an initiative to raise the public profile of sustainable fashion, founded by Livia Firth of Eco-Age. In September 2020, as part of her role as Jury President of the 77th Venice International Film Festival, she vowed that during the festival she would only wear outfits that she had previously worn at public events in an effort to highlight the issue of sustainability in the fashion industry. In October of the same year, Blanchett was appointed by Prince William as a council member for the Earthshot Prize, which provides 50 environmental pioneers with the funds needed to further their work in tackling major problems impacting the environment. In 2022, Blanchett and environmental activist Danny Kennedy launched the Climate of Change podcast on Audible to discuss climate change and the importance of preserving the environment. In 2024, Blanchett was announced as the new ambassador of Wakehurst, a nature reserve in England. The following year, she hosted a series of the Unearthed: The Need for Seeds podcast by Royal Botanic Gardens Kew, covering the history of the Millennium Seed Bank at the site.

The ecohouse that Blanchett and Upton are having built in Mawgan Porth, Cornwall, on the site of a stone cottage they bought for £1.6 million and then demolished, has been the subject of controversy, as the noise from its construction is alleged to have "destroyed the family holidays" of a number of people in 2023. The couple's application to build an extension and space for parking had been described by a local resident as a "blatant attempt to erode an environmentally important piece of land by stealth and incorporate it". The architects developing the site denied that anyone has been inconvenienced by the noise.

=== Humanitarian ===
Like you, I have heard the gut-wrenching accounts. Stories of grave torture, of women brutally violated, people who have had their loved ones killed before their eyes. Children who have seen their grandparents locked in houses that were set alight.

I am a mother, and I saw my children in the eyes of every single refugee child I met. I saw myself in every parent. How can any mother endure seeing her child thrown into a fire?

— Part of Blanchett's address to the United Nations Security Council about the Rohingya refugee crisis in August 2018.

Blanchett has been working with the United Nations High Commissioner for Refugees (UNHCR) since 2015. In May 2016, the UNHCR announced her appointment as a global Goodwill Ambassador. Blanchett, along with other celebrities, featured in a video from the UNHCR to help raise awareness to the global refugee crisis. The video, titled "What They Took With Them", has the actors reading a poem written by Jenifer Toksvig and inspired by primary accounts of refugees, and is part of UNHCR's "WithRefugees" campaign, which also includes a petition to governments to expand asylum to provide further shelter, integrating job opportunities, and education.

Blanchett has undertaken missions with the UNHCR to Jordan in 2015, Lebanon in 2016 and Bangladesh in 2018 to meet with and highlight the issues faced by both Syrian and Rohingya refugees in those areas. In January 2018, she was awarded the Crystal Award at the World Economic Forum to honour her advocacy for refugees and displaced people around the world, and in August 2018, she addressed the United Nations Security Council about the atrocities committed against the Rohingya people in Myanmar.

In July 2020, the Australian miniseries Stateless, which was co-created and produced by Blanchett (and originally aired on the ABC network in Australia), premiered on Netflix. The series was inspired by Blanchett's work with the UNHCR and focuses on four strangers whose lives collide at an immigration detention centre in Australia. In Blanchett's words, the show's aim is to "build empathy and understanding for refugees, particularly those who have been and still are in detention."

As an esteemed member of the performing arts community that was seriously impacted by the COVID-19 pandemic, and a person concerned about environmental and humanitarian issues, Blanchett contributed an essay to Upturn: A Better Normal After COVID-19, a book published in 2020 about what could be done to improve society after the pandemic in her native Australia. Blanchett said:

We engage with the performance of the gesture and the whole of it is greater than the sum of its parts. I think this need to gather is fundamental to who we are, and it has been stymied by Covid-19 but also underlined by it, and that need in us for community addresses the difficult lesson we have to learn: business is not government and government is not a business.

In May 2020, Blanchett was among the celebrities who read an instalment of Roald Dahl's children's fantasy novel James and the Giant Peach in aid of the global-non profit charity Partners In Health, co-founded by Dahl's daughter Ophelia, which had been fighting COVID-19 in vulnerable areas.

In September 2020, Blanchett, Helen Mirren, Eddie Redmayne, Salman Rushdie and other figures of British cultural life support the protests of University for Theater and Film Arts (SZFE) students in Budapest against changes ushered Prime Minister Viktor Orban's government that forced a transfer of control of the public institution to a private foundation and a new structure to guide key decisions at the storied SZFE.

She expressed solidarity with the people of the Gaza Strip during the Gaza war. As part of a group called Artists4Ceasefire, she signed a letter urging President Joe Biden to call for an immediate ceasefire in Gaza.

== Personal life ==
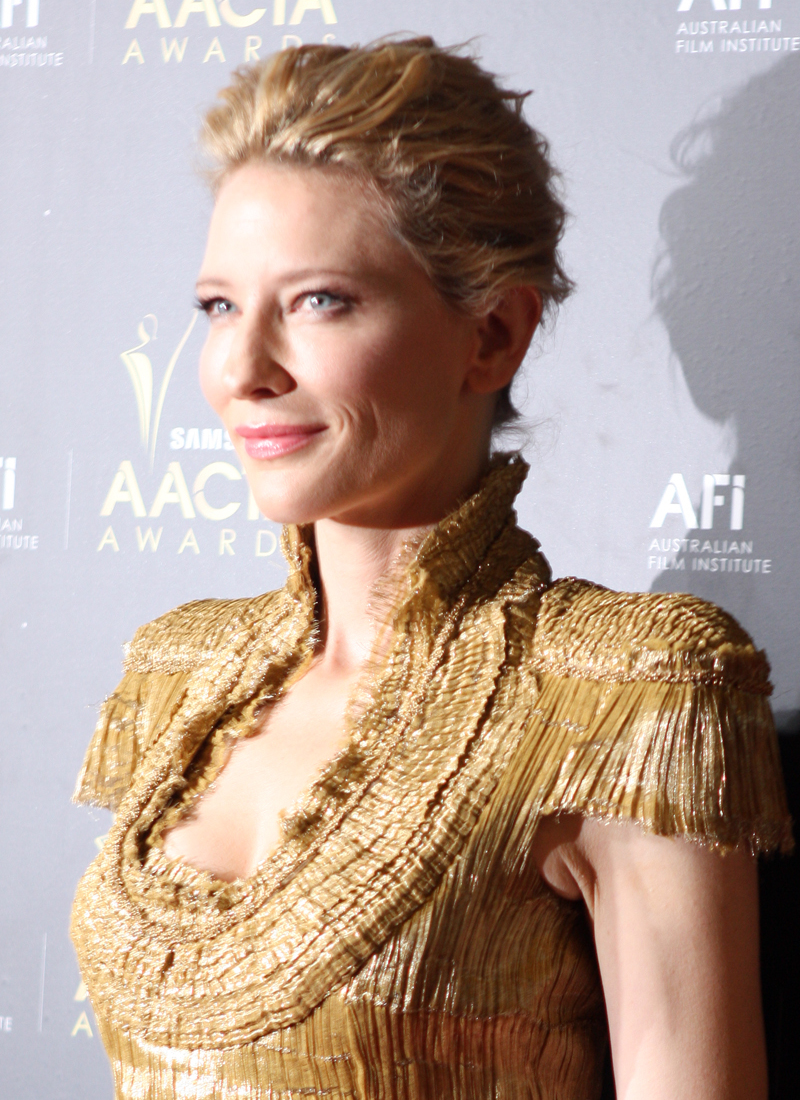
Blanchett at the Inaugural AACTA Awards in 2012

Blanchett is married to playwright and screenwriter Andrew Upton. They met in Australia in the mid-1990s and married on 21 June 1997. They have three sons, and a daughter, who was adopted in 2015. Blanchett said that she and her husband had wanted to adopt since the birth of their first son.

After making Brighton, England their main home for nearly 10 years, she and her husband returned to their native Australia in 2006. Blanchett attributed the move to their desire to select a permanent home for her children, to be closer to her family, and to have a sense of belonging to the Australian theatrical community. In 2007, she and her family extensively renovated their home in the Sydney suburb of Hunters Hill to be more eco-friendly. Following its sale in 2015, she and Upton relocated back to England and purchased a house in Crowborough, East Sussex, in early 2016.

Blanchett has spoken about feminism and politics, telling Sky News in 2013 that she was concerned that "a wave of conservatism sweeping the globe" was threatening women's role in society. She has also commented on the pressures women in Hollywood face now: "Honestly, I think about my appearance less than I did ten years ago. People talk about the golden age of Hollywood because of how women were lit then. You could be Joan Crawford and Bette Davis and work well into your 50s, because you were lit and made into a goddess. Now, with everything being sort of gritty, women have this sense of their use-by date."

Blanchett was the first ambassador and has been a patron of the Australian Film Institute and its academy, the Australian Academy of Cinema and Television Arts, since 2001. She is also a patron of the Sydney Film Festival, and of the Australian Pavilion in the Venice Biennale, speaking at its opening at the Venice Giardini in May 2015. Blanchett spoke at former Prime Minister of Australia Gough Whitlam's state funeral in 2014, and at the Margaret Whitlam dinner and fundraiser event hosted by politician Tanya Plibersek in June 2015.

Blanchett became a spokeswoman for and the face of SK-II, the luxury skin care brand owned by Procter & Gamble, in 2005, and brand ambassador for Giorgio Armani fragrances for women in 2013, being paid $10 million for the latter. In 2018, Armani announced Blanchett would become the first beauty ambassador for the company, representing it globally by absorbing responsibilities for skincare and make-up, in addition to her previous 2013 commitments to fragrances. In 2022, Louis Vuitton announced Blanchett as its new house ambassador.

== Acting credits and accolades ==
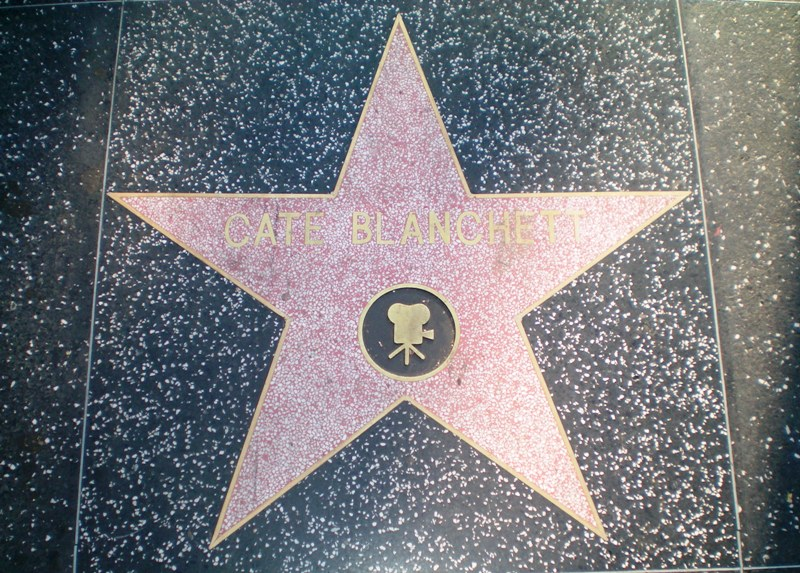
Blanchett's star on the Hollywood Walk of Fame

Blanchett has appeared in over 70 films and over 20 theatre productions. As of 2019, Blanchett's films have grossed over $9.8 billion at the worldwide box office. Her highest-grossing films include The Lord of the Rings (2001–2003) and The Hobbit (2012–2014) trilogies, The Curious Case of Benjamin Button (2008), Indiana Jones and the Kingdom of the Crystal Skull (2008), Cinderella (2015), Thor: Ragnarok (2017), and Ocean's 8 (2018).

Among her numerous accolades for her acting work, Blanchett has won two Academy Awards, four BAFTA Awards, four Golden Globe Awards, and three Actor Awards. Her performance as Katharine Hepburn in The Aviator made her the only actor to win an Academy Award for portraying an Academy Award-winning actor. Blanchett is one of only four actors to win the Academy Award for Best Actress after winning Best Supporting Actress. She is the only female actor (and one of only six actors) in Oscar history to be nominated twice for playing the same role in two films (Elizabeth I for Elizabeth and Elizabeth: The Golden Age), and the eleventh actor to receive two acting nominations in the same year. She is also the only Australian to win two acting Oscars.

Blanchett has been recognised by the Academy of Motion Picture Arts and Sciences for the following performances:

- 71st Academy Awards (1998): Best Actress, nomination, Elizabeth
- 77th Academy Awards (2004): Best Supporting Actress, win, The Aviator
- 79th Academy Awards (2006): Best Supporting Actress, nomination, Notes on a Scandal
- 80th Academy Awards (2007): Best Actress, nomination, Elizabeth: The Golden Age
- 80th Academy Awards (2007): Best Supporting Actress, nomination, I'm Not There
- 86th Academy Awards (2013): Best Actress, win, Blue Jasmine
- 88th Academy Awards (2015): Best Actress, nomination, Carol
- 95th Academy Awards (2022): Best Actress, nomination, Tár

Blanchett received Premiere magazine's Icon Award in 2006. In 2008, she received the Santa Barbara International Film Festival Modern Master Award in recognition of her accomplishments in the film industry. That year, she received a Star on the Hollywood Walk of Fame, inducted at 6712 Hollywood Boulevard outside Grauman's Egyptian Theatre. She received Women in Film and Television International's Crystal Award for excellence in the entertainment industry in 2014. In 2015, Blanchett was honoured at the Museum of Modern Art's Film Benefit for her outstanding contributions to the industry. She received the British Film Institute Fellowship in recognition of her outstanding contribution to film, presented to her by fellow actor Ian McKellen. Blanchett was also the recipient of the AACTA Longford Lyell Award in 2015, for her "outstanding contribution to the enrichment of Australia's screen environment and culture." In 2016, she received the Costume Designers Guild Lacoste Spotlight Award, in honour of an "enduring commitment to excellence" and her "appreciation for the artistry of costume design and collaboration with the Costume Designers."

Blanchett was awarded the Centenary Medal for Service to Australian Society by the Australian government. In 2012, she was appointed Chevalier of the Order of Arts and Letters by the French Minister of Culture, in recognition of her significant contributions to the arts. In 2017, Blanchett was made a Companion of the Order of Australia by the Queen for "eminent service to the performing arts as an international stage and screen actor, through seminal contributions as director of artistic organisations, as a role model for women and young performers, and as a supporter of humanitarian and environmental causes." She has been presented with honorary Doctor of Letters degree from the University of Sydney, the University of New South Wales and Macquarie University in recognition of her contribution to the arts, philanthropy and the community. St Catherine's College, Oxford, appointed Blanchett as their Cameron Mackintosh Visiting Professor of Contemporary Theatre for the 2026/27 academic year.

In 2022, she received the Honorary César award from the Académie des Arts et Techniques du Cinéma for her "absolutely remarkable career and personality". At the 2024 Toronto International Film Festival, she was named the recipient of the Share Her Journey Groundbreaker Award, which is presented to women who have made a positive difference in improving conditions for women in the film industry.

In 2026, Blanchett was awarded the Praemium Imperiale in the category Film/Theatre.

== See also ==
- List of Academy Award records
- List of actors nominated for multiple Academy Awards in the same year
- List of actors with two or more Academy Awards in acting categories
- List of actors with Academy Award nominations
- List of actors with more than one Academy Award nomination in the acting categories
- List of actors with Hollywood Walk of Fame motion picture stars
- List of Academy Award winners and nominees from Australia
- List of Golden Globe winners
- List of Australian film actors
