= Big and Little =

1978 play by Botho Strauss

Big and Little (German: Groß und klein) is a 1978 play by German writer Botho Strauß. It is a station drama in ten scenes and follows a woman, Lotte, who travels through Germany and seeks human connections, but is unsuccessful as every person she encounters is locked into his own world. The play has the subtitle Scenes (Szenen) and has also been performed in English as Big and Small.

It premiered on 8 December 1978 at the Schaubühne am Halleschen Ufer in West Berlin, directed by Peter Stein and starring Edith Clever. It was broadcast as a German television play in 1980. Other TV versions include a 1995 Portuguese language adaptation that was cut to 1 hour and 20 minutes, and a 1998 episode of Poland's Teatr Telewizji, which starred Teresa Budzisz-Krzyzanowska as Lotte, and similarly trimmed the runtime to 1 hour 25 minute.

The play has also been titled Great and Small, as was the case for a 1983 British production which starred Glenda Jackson.

== Reception ==
John Simon reviewed the play in New York in 1979, when it was first performed in the United States: "The stultifying banality of the play is matched only by its arrogance—it is, for example, written in a pointless free verse that becomes even flatter in Anne Cattaneo's translation. The only thing big about Big and Little is its pretentiousness; everything else, except its length, is little." Mel Gussow of The New York Times described the play in 1983 as "theoretically tantalizing, more interesting to contemplate than to experience and less adventurous than works by Mr. Strauss's peers such as Peter Handke and Franz Xaver Kroetz." He added, however, that it "does succeed in acting as a theatrical stimulant. Having seen it, one will want to talk about it."

A performance starring Cate Blanchett was staged at the Barbican Centre in London in 2012. Tim Auld wrote in The Daily Telegraph that the play is "about as bleak a two and three quarter hours as you're likely to while away in the theatre", but that "it does, however, offer that rarest of things in modern drama: a virtuoso role for a lead actress, the main character, Lotte, being on stage for nearly every second of the performance".
