= List of actors nominated for multiple Academy Awards in the same year =

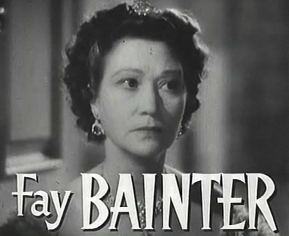
Fay Bainter, shown here in Jezebel (1938), was the first person to be nominated for two Oscars in the same year. She won Best Supporting Actress for Jezebel and was nominated for Best Actress for White Banners.

A dozen people have been nominated for two Academy Awards in acting categories in a single year, the first in 1938 and the most recent in 2019.

According to the Academy of Motion Picture Arts and Sciences rule, an actor or actress cannot receive multiple nominations for the same performance. The rule was introduced in 1945, after Barry Fitzgerald received a Best Actor nomination and a Best Supporting Actor nomination for his performance in Going My Way. Until the 98th Academy Awards in 2026, they could not receive multiple nominations for different performances in the same category (they could be nominated for maximum one leading performance and one supporting performance in a single year). However, in May 2026 the Academy reverted the rule, so starting from the 99th Academy Awards in 2027 an actor or actress may receive multiple nominations in the same category.

As of 2026, 12 actors and actresses have been nominated for two Academy Awards in the same year. The first was Fay Bainter, who received nominations for her performances in White Banners and Jezebel at the 11th Academy Awards. The most recent occurrence was the 92nd Academy Awards, when Scarlett Johansson received her first nominations, for Marriage Story and Jojo Rabbit. Seven of these actors and actresses received an Academy Award in one of the categories for which they were nominated, but none have won two Academy Awards in the same year. Five did not receive an Academy Award in either category: Sigourney Weaver (nominations for Gorillas in the Mist and Working Girl), Emma Thompson (nominations for The Remains of the Day and In the Name of the Father), Julianne Moore (nominations for Far from Heaven and The Hours), Cate Blanchett (nominations for Elizabeth: The Golden Age and I'm Not There), and Johansson. Thompson's nominations came in 1993, when Holly Hunter also received two nominations (for The Piano and The Firm).

== Nominees ==
Year (Ceremony)	Actor/Actress	Category	Film title used in nomination	Result
1938 (11th)	Fay Bainter	Best Actress	White Banners	Nominated
1938 (11th)	Fay Bainter	Best Supporting Actress	Jezebel	Won
1942 (15th)	Teresa Wright	Best Actress	The Pride of the Yankees	Nominated
1942 (15th)	Teresa Wright	Best Supporting Actress	Mrs. Miniver	Won
1944 (17th)	Barry Fitzgerald	Best Actor	Going My Way	Nominated
1944 (17th)	Barry Fitzgerald	Best Supporting Actor	Going My Way	Won
1982 (55th)	Jessica Lange	Best Actress	Frances	Nominated
1982 (55th)	Jessica Lange	Best Supporting Actress	Tootsie	Won
1988 (61st)	Sigourney Weaver	Best Actress	Gorillas in the Mist	Nominated
1988 (61st)	Sigourney Weaver	Best Supporting Actress	Working Girl	Nominated
1992 (65th)	Al Pacino	Best Actor	Scent of a Woman	Won
1992 (65th)	Al Pacino	Best Supporting Actor	Glengarry Glen Ross	Nominated
1993 (66th)	Holly Hunter	Best Actress	The Piano	Won
1993 (66th)	Holly Hunter	Best Supporting Actress	The Firm	Nominated
1993 (66th)	Emma Thompson	Best Actress	The Remains of the Day	Nominated
1993 (66th)	Emma Thompson	Best Supporting Actress	In the Name of the Father	Nominated
2002 (75th)	Julianne Moore	Best Actress	Far from Heaven	Nominated
2002 (75th)	Julianne Moore	Best Supporting Actress	The Hours	Nominated
2004 (77th)	Jamie Foxx	Best Actor	Ray	Won
2004 (77th)	Jamie Foxx	Best Supporting Actor	Collateral	Nominated
2007 (80th)	Cate Blanchett	Best Actress	Elizabeth: The Golden Age	Nominated
2007 (80th)	Cate Blanchett	Best Supporting Actress	I'm Not There	Nominated
2019 (92nd)	Scarlett Johansson	Best Actress	Marriage Story	Nominated
2019 (92nd)	Scarlett Johansson	Best Supporting Actress	Jojo Rabbit	Nominated

== See also ==
- List of actors nominated for Academy Awards for non-English performances
