= Timothy Daly (playwright) =

Australian playwright

- Writing career
- Notable work: Kafka Dances

Timothy Daly is an Australian playwright, dramaturg, and teacher, whose plays have won awards and been produced around the world since 1982.

== Early life and education ==
Daly graduated from UWS Theatre Nepean in 1992.

== Career ==
Daly is a playwright, dramaturg, and teacher. Many of his plays have been produced both in Australia and internationally since 1982.

His 2008 play Derrida in Love, was written for Jacki Weaver, which she performed in a sold-out season at the Ensemble Theatre, Sydney.

Daly's play Kafka Dances has won a dozen national and international awards since its premiere and is one of the most frequently internationally performed Australian plays.

His play Richard III (or almost) premiered at the 2011 Festival d'Avignon and followed with a Paris season in October–November 2012. Daly's play, The Man in the Attic, was awarded the Patrick White Playwrights' Award for best new play. It has been staged in Paris, at the 2013 Festival d'Avignon.

== Recognition ==
=== Awards ===
- The Man in the Attic – Winner of the Patrick White Award for Best New Play
- Kafka Dances – Winner of a Sydney Theatre Critics' award for Best New Australian Play; Finalist for both the New South Wales Premier's Literary Award and the Victorian Premier's Literary Award; Winner of 5 South African Vita (now known as the Naledi Theatre Awards)
- Outlanders – Winner of Australian Writers Guild AWGIE Award
- The Private Visions of Gottfried Kellner – Winner of Australian Writers Guild AWGIE Award for Best Stage Play; finalist in the Victorian Premiers Literary Award for drama
- Three Australian Council for the Arts Literary Awards

=== Residencies and fellowships ===
- Keesing Studio Residency Award (Paris) from the Australia Council for the Arts, 2013.
- Friends of the National Library Creative Arts Fellowship from the National Library of Australia, 2017, to progress a script for psychological thriller, Perfume.

== Selected works ==
=== Theatre ===
- The Don's Last Innings (Sydney Theatre Company; Launceston Theatre Company; Riverina Theatre Company; State Theatre Company of South Australia)
- Derrida in Love (Ensemble Theatre)
- Kafka Dances (Griffin Theatre Company; Sydney Theatre Company; La Boite Theatre Company; Cherry Tree Theatre; Market Theatre; Zenith Theatre; High-Doh Theatre; Axis Theater; State Theatre Company of South Australia; Cyrano's Theater Company; Star Théâtre; Theatre des Opprimés; Théâtre de Chevilly-Larue; Comédie De l'Est; Saint-Cyr-l'École; Saint-Maur-des-Fossés; Festival de Cornouaille; Festival d'Avignon and toured to Strasbourg; Valenciennes; Nîmes and Draveil)
- The Man in the Attic (Star Théâtre; Festival d'Avignon; Théatre l'Avant Seine; Théatre Bois de l'Épée)
- Beach: A Theatrical Fantasia (National Institute of Dramatic Art, graduation production commission)
- The Quiz King (New Theatre)
- The Critic Assassinated (National Institute of Dramatic Art; Mummers Theatre)
- The Moonwalkers (Griffin Theatre Company; Street Theatre Company)
- Complicity (Marian Street Theatre)
- The Private Visions of Gottfried Kellner (Griffin Theatre Company; Bakehouse Theatre, Adelaide)
- Livingstone (Marian Street Theatre; Ice House Theater; Effie Crump Theatre; Riverina Theatre Company; Brisbane Arts Theatre; Pymble Players and toured regionally to Kalgoorlie)

=== Television, translations and adaptations ===
- Song For Two in the Night (Theodor Weißenborn)
- The Double Bass (Patrick Süskind) Ensemble Theatre
- Liebelei (Flirtations) (Arthur Schnitzler) Australian Broadcasting Corporation
- Interior (Maurice Maeterlinck) Australian Broadcasting Corporation
- Hours of the Dying (Hans Johst) Australian Broadcasting Corporation
- Neighbours (various episodes, Grundy Corporation)
- A Lapse in Behaviour (Australian Broadcasting Corporation; British Broadcasting Corporation; South African Broadcasting Corporation; New Zealand Broadcasting Corporation; Canadian Broadcasting Corporation)

=== Opera librettos ===
- How to Kill Your Husband and Other Handy Household Hints (based on the novel by Kathy Lette; music by Alan John; produced by Victorian Opera) in 2011
